= 5.1 surround sound =

Sound systems that use 5 speakers and one subwoofer

Most common loudspeaker configuration for 5.1; used by Dolby Digital, SDDS, DTS, and Dolby Pro Logic II. The white square in the center of the diagram depicts the low-frequency speaker. Each black square depicts a loudspeaker. The center speaker in the top line of the diagram is used for dialogue. The left and right speakers on either side of the center speaker are used to create stereo sound for music and other sound effects in the film. The left and right surround speakers in the bottom line create the surround sound effect.

5.1 surround sound ("five-point one") is the common name for surround sound audio systems, and the most commonly used layout in home theatres. It uses five full-bandwidth channels and one low-frequency effects channel (the "point one"). Dolby Digital, Dolby Pro Logic II, DTS, and SDDS are all common 5.1 systems. 5.1 is also the standard surround sound audio component of digital broadcast and music.

All 5.1 systems use the same speaker channels and configuration, having a front left (FL) and front right (FR), a center channel (CNT), two surround channels (surround left - SL and surround right - SR) and the low-frequency effects (LFE) channel designed for a subwoofer.

== History ==
An early predecessor to five-channel surround sound appeared with the 1953 20th Century-Fox film The Robe. The studio felt the film needed a larger soundstage to match its wider CinemaScope presentation, and released it with four-track magnetic stereo sound with left, right, center and mono surround channels. Dolby Stereo was introduced by Dolby Laboratories in the 1970s, which similarly featured a four-channel soundtrack.

A prototype for five-channel surround sound, then dubbed "quintaphonic sound", was used in the 1975 film Tommy. However, it had no dedicated subwoofer channel and used only two surround speakers in the rear corners of the auditorium, thus causing the same problems with audience coverage uniformity that had been fixed in Fantasound (1939) by using surround arrays. There was an early Dolby application of optical matrix encoding in 1976 on the film Logan's Run, but it did not use split surrounds, and thus was not true 5.1.

The 1977 release of Star Wars featured a six-track stereo mix developed by Dolby, called "baby boom", that consolidated vocals to the center channel, while the left-center and right-center channels were used to enhance deep bass effects. Dolby first used split surrounds with 70 mm film during the postproduction of Apocalypse Now (1979), which director Francis Ford Coppola and editor Walter Murch used to create a more immersive soundscape for the film's helicopter sequences. Because of the lengthy production of Apocalypse Now, Superman (1978) was the first film released with split surrounds. Instead of the five screen channels and single surround channel of the Todd-AO format, Dolby Stereo 70 mm Six Track provided three screen channels, two high-passed surround channels, and a monophonic low-frequency channel. The name 5.1 was given in a Society of Motion Picture and Television Engineers (SMPTE) Committee on Digital Sound on Film in 1987 by Tomlinson Holman.

The first system with digital 5.1 surround sound was Dolby Digital in 1992 with Batman Returns, followed by DTS with Jurassic Park in 1993, and SDDS with Last Action Hero in 1993. Kodak and Optical Radiation Corporation introduced Cinema Digital Sound (CDS) in 1990 with Dick Tracy, but it had no analog backup and was phased out shortly after failing on opening day.

In 1982, Tomlinson Holman built a four-channel panner for Return of the Jedi (1983) using parts from his earlier Apt/Holman preamplifier. It was extended to 5.1 by Sound Workshop (with proper credit) and SSL in its 5000 Series (with no credit). The console included ABCDEF channels: respectively, A left, B right, C centre, D left rear, E right rear, F bass.

When digital sound was applied to 35 mm release prints, with Batman Returns in 1992, the 5.1 layout was adopted. The ability to provide 5.1 sound had been one of the key reasons for using 70 mm for prestige screenings. The provision of 5.1 digital sound on 35 mm significantly reduced the use of the more expensive 70 mm format.

5.1 digital surround, in the forms of Dolby Digital AC-3 and DTS, started appearing on several mid-1990s LaserDisc releases, among the earliest being Clear and Present Danger and Jurassic Park (the latter having both AC3 and DTS versions). Many DVD releases have Dolby Digital tracks up to 5.1 channels, due to the implementation of Dolby Digital in the development of the DVD format. In addition, some DVDs have DTS tracks, with most being 5.1 channel mixes (a few releases, however, have 6.1 "matrixed" or even discrete 6.1 tracks). Blu-ray and digital cinema both have eight-channel capability, which can be used to provide either 5.1 or 7.1 surround sound. 7.1 is an extension of 5.1 that uses four surround zones, with two at the sides and two at the back.

== Application ==
=== Channel order ===
The order of channels in a 5.1 file is different across file formats. The order in WAV files is (not complete) front left, front right, center, low-frequency effects, surround left and surround right.

=== Music ===
Suggested configuration for 5.1 music listening

In music, the main goal of 5.1 surround sound is a proper localization and equability of all acoustic sources for a center-positioned audience. Therefore, ideally five matched speakers should be used.

=== Speaker placement ===
The International Telecommunication Union (ITU) recommends the following configuration (ITU-R BS 775) for playback:

- five speakers of the same size for front, center and surround
- identical distance from the listeners for all five speakers
- angle adjustment regarding viewing direction of audience: center 0°, front ±22.5° for movies ±30° for music, surround ±110°

== See also ==
- Category:5.1 surround sound albums
- 7.1 surround sound
- Ambisonics
- Stereophonic sound
- Timeline of audio formats
