= FireWave =

The FireWave is a device that is, essentially, an external FireWire sound card made by Griffin Technology as a third-party accessory for Apple Inc.'s line of personal computers.

FireWave uses the FireWire (IEEE 1394) port of the Mac as an audio output to its Dolby Digital sound processing hardware, effectively acting as an external sound card.

Griffin Technology's product website explains that FireWave uses the Dolby processors to allow the user to connect a 5.1 surround sound system. Speakers are then connected directly to FireWave's speaker terminals. Many different sound setups and configurations are possible, using a combination of Griffin's included FireWave software and Apple's "Audio MIDI Setup" utility.

Griffin Technology's website lists the Griffin FireWave as a discontinued item.

== Technical ==
FireWave has six output channels through three 1/8” (3.5 mm) stereo mini-jacks: Left/Right, Center/Subwoofer and Right Surround/Left Surround. There is also a passthrough FireWire port to allow for chaining more FireWire devices.

FireWave supports Dolby Digital and Dolby Pro Logic II, and has a frequency response of 20-20,000 Hz.

Compatibility: The FireWave is listed as being compatible with Mac OS X version 10.4.6 (Tiger). Officially, Griffin Technology does not support the FireWave under OS X 10.5.x (Leopard), however version 1.0 of the FireWave software does work with Leopard.

Griffin has announced the discontinuation of this product, so it is unlikely that Leopard-specific drivers will be released.
