= 7.1 surround sound =

Sound systems that use 7 speakers and one subwoofer

Label for 7.1 extended surround sound

7.1 surround sound is the common name for an eight-channel surround audio system commonly used in home theatre configurations. It adds two additional speakers to the more conventional six-channel (5.1) audio configuration. As with 5.1 surround sound, 7.1 surround sound positional audio uses the standard front left and right, center, and LFE (subwoofer) speaker configuration. However, whereas a 5.1 surround sound system combines both surround and rear channel effects into two channels (commonly configured in home theatre set-ups as two rear surround speakers), a 7.1 surround system splits the surround and rear channel information into four distinct channels, in which sound effects are directed to left and right surround channels (SL and SR), plus two rear surround channels (SBL and SBR).

In a 7.1 surround sound home theatre set-up, the surround speakers are placed to the side of the listener's position and the rear speakers are placed behind the listener. In addition, with the advent of Dolby Pro Logic IIz and DTS Neo:X, 7.1 surround sound can also refer to 7.1 surround sound configurations with the addition of two front height channels (LH and RH) positioned above the front channels or two front wide channels positioned between the front and surround channels.

== History ==
=== Home entertainment ===
The Blu-ray Disc and HD DVD home video formats provide up to eight channels of lossless DTS-HD Master Audio, Dolby TrueHD or uncompressed LPCM audio at 96/48 kHz 24/16-bit, or lossy Dolby Digital Plus up to 48 kHz at 1024 kilobytes per second.

=== Cinema ===
While some movies have been remixed to 7.1 audio tracks on Blu-ray Discs for home cinema, the first discrete theatrical 7.1 soundtrack was Toy Story 3 in 2010. Other films with 7.1 soundtracks from 2010 include Step Up 3D, Megamind, Tangled, Tron: Legacy, Gulliver's Travels, and The Chronicles of Narnia: The Voyage of the Dawn Treader. 2011 saw more films release with theatrical 7.1 audio, including Gnomeo & Juliet, Mars Needs Moms, Thor, Pirates of the Caribbean: On Stranger Tides, Kung Fu Panda 2, Super 8, Green Lantern, Cars 2, Transformers: Dark of the Moon, Captain America: The First Avenger. In 2012, the Indian film Pizza became the first Tamil language film to be released with theatrical 7.1 surround. All aforementioned titles were exhibited in the Dolby Surround 7.1 theatrical format.

=== Music ===
The history of electronic music includes the evolution of multi-channel playback in concert (arguably the real roots of "surround sound" for cinema) and for a considerable time the 8-channel format was a de facto standard. This standardisation was fostered, in great measure, by the development of professional and semi-professional 8-track tape recorders—originally analog, but later manifesting in proprietary cassette formats by Alesis and Tascam. The speaker configuration, however, is much less traditional, and unlike cinematic reproduction systems, there is no hard-and-fast "standard". In fact, composers took (and to some extent still take) considerable interest in experimenting with speaker layouts. In these experiments, the goal is not limited to creating "realistic" playback of believably natural sonic environments. Rather, the goals are often simply to experience and understand the psychoacoustics effect created by variations on source and imaging.

Some of the first live concerts to appear were Chris Botti in Boston in 2009 and Satchurated in 2012.

== See also ==
- Category:7.1 surround sound albums
- 5.1 surround sound
- Ambisonics
- Timeline of audio formats
