= Ultra Stereo =

Cinema sound system

- Product type: Sound format Surround sound
- Current owner: Ultra Stereo Labs
- Country: United States
- Introduced: 1984
- Markets: Worldwide

Ultra Stereo, stylized as ULTRA★STEREO, is a cinema sound system that was developed in 1984 by chief engineer Jack Cashin.

It was a 4/2/4 photographic sound encoding and decoding procedure compatible with (and using the same technical basic structure, with identical sound quality as) its competitor Dolby Stereo matrix.

== Implementation ==
Four channels of information (Left, Center, Right and Surround) were matrix-encoded into two optical soundtracks on 35 mm theatrical release prints, occupying the same area of the film which previously held the monophonic soundtrack. The matrix-encoded track was decoded by the cinema processor in the theater during exhibition.

== History ==
Ultra Stereo Labs (USL), which had been concentrating on the manufacture of sound equipment for studio screening rooms, was drawn into the exhibition-end of the business. The company developed a cinema processor, and over the next several years kept improving it and eventually placed the processor in theaters. Specifically, the USL cinema processor achieved greater channel separation than had been possible up to that time. Ultra Stereo Labs was awarded a Technical Achievement Award from the Academy of Motion Picture Arts and Sciences in 1984, for making improvements in film sound.

Soon after, USL also became involved in encoding movie soundtracks. Since they had been manufacturing studio equipment for quite some time, people asked the company to develop encoding equipment for making print masters. Films encoded in Ultra Stereo can also be decoded on Dolby Cinema processors, as it was designed to be compatible with Dolby Stereo (using A-Type noise reduction) prints.

In October 2016, Ultra Stereo was acquired by QSC, LLC.

== Later developments ==
The Ultra Stereo JS series model 105/195 unit introduced a six-channel discrete input module (JFM-20 SR) circa 1993, which creates a THX approved 5.1 surround field. This is a line-level input that can accept the output from a DVD player with 5.1 discrete channel outputs. The JS series eventually evolved into later models, including the JSD-80, JSD-100, and now the JSD-60.

When the industry moved away from analog soundtracks, USL transitioned to digital processing in all their audio products. In 2008, USL assembled a team of engineers to develop imaging technology for digital theater. The result of this research and development was a leading-edge digital theater high frame rate media block and now an "all-in-one" media block with solid-state storage drives. Ultra Stereo Labs continues to provide modern decoders, picture analyzers, and other devices for motion picture theaters.

== Adoption ==
In 1999, the company mentioned that Ultra Stereo was used on "over 2000" movie soundtracks. As of 2025, the Internet Movie Database lists 1,597 titles using this format. Unlike the Dolby process, however, using the Ultra Stereo process did not require licensing fees, reducing costs for filmmakers and studios.
