= Dolby Surround 7.1 =

Sound system developed by Dolby

- Product type: Surround sound
- Current owner: Dolby Laboratories
- Country: United States
- Introduced: 2010
- Related brands: Dolby Digital
- Markets: Worldwide
- Website: Dolby official website

Dolby Surround 7.1 (sometimes called Dolby 7.1 surround sound) is a surround sound system by Dolby Laboratories which delivers theatrical 7.1 surround sound to movie-goers. It is the most recent addition to a family of audio compression technologies developed by Dolby known as Dolby Digital.

It adds two new rear surround channels to Dolby Digital 5.1. The first film to feature Dolby Surround 7.1 was 2010's Toy Story 3 by Walt Disney Pictures and Pixar.

== See also ==
- Dolby Digital
- 7.1 surround sound
