= Dipole speaker =

Sound-producing device

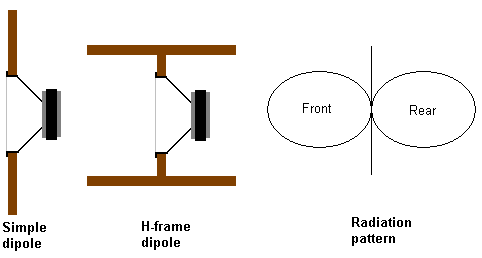
Dipole speakers and their radiation pattern.

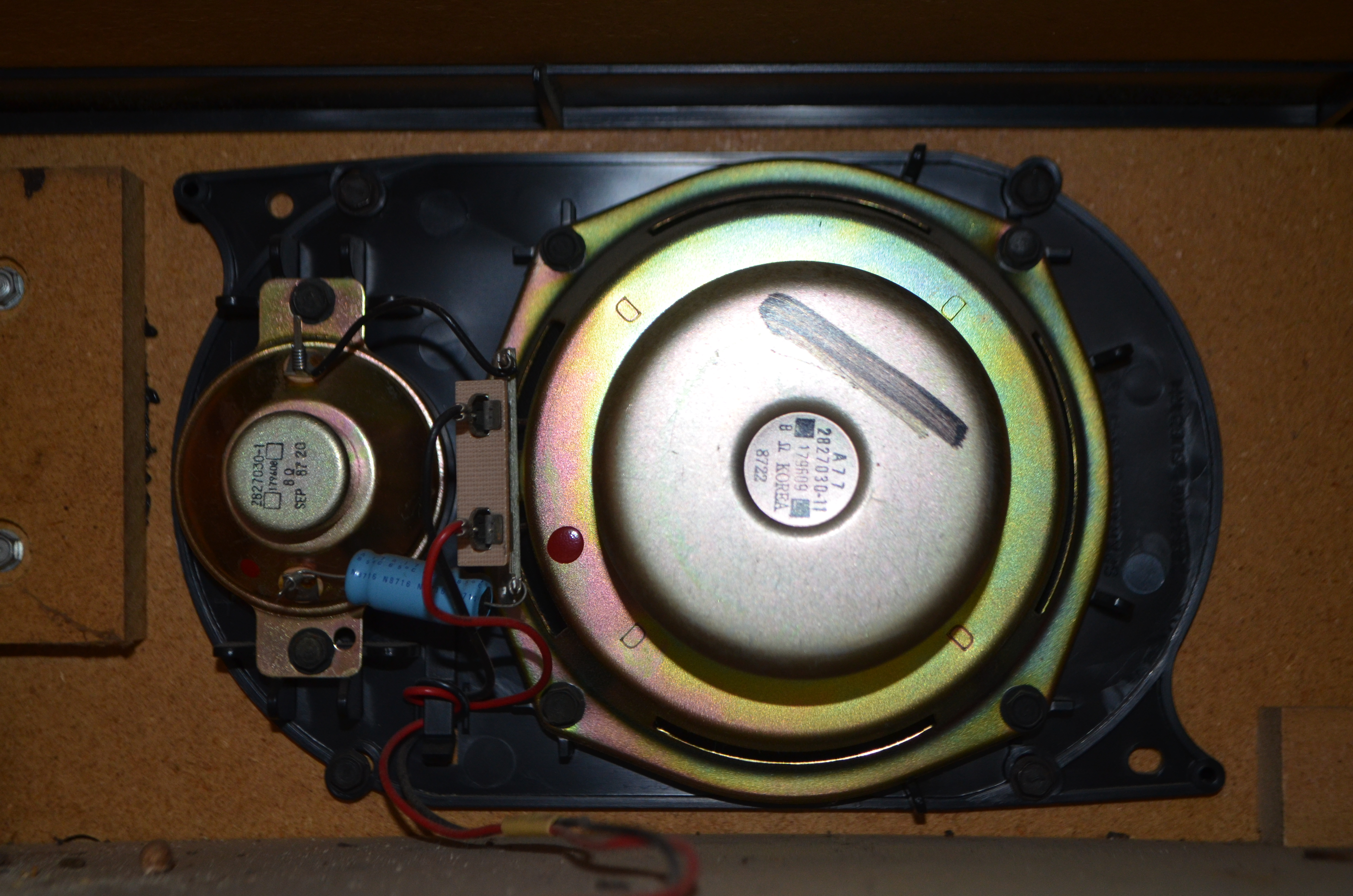
RCA Dimensia speaker mounted on a baffle with no back

A dipole speaker enclosure in its simplest form is constructed by mounting a loudspeaker driver on a flat panel. The panel may be folded to conserve space.

The term dipole derives from the fact that the polar response consists of two lobes, with equal radiation forwards and backwards, and none perpendicular to the axis. (By comparison a monopole response consists of one lobe.) This can be useful in reducing the stimulation of resonant room modes at low frequencies. It also results in high frequencies being reflected from any rear wall, which can enhance the naturalness of the sound in typical listening rooms by creating more diffuse reverberation, though in theory it could detract from stereo localization. For this reason dipole speakers are often used as surround channel speakers, where a diffuse sound is desired to create ambience.

A dipole speaker works by creating air movement (as sound pressure waves) directly from the front and back surfaces of the driver, rather than by impedance matching one or both outputs to the air. As a result, diaphragm motion below the driver's resonance frequency is constrained primarily by the driver's restoring force (e.g., diaphragm suspension) and not by acoustic loading from an enclosure. This implies that cone motion at the lowest frequencies will be larger at the same output level than in a more usual enclosure, and that power handling will be accordingly limited. Especially at lower frequencies, dipole drivers tend to be large and flat, and necessarily open at both front and back. Common examples include electrostatic or ribbon drivers, though a conventional cone driver mounted in an open baffle also works as a dipole loudspeaker. All of these variations are characterised by a "figure-of-eight" radiation pattern in which the loudness falls towards the sides of the enclosure where interference between front and back waves is maximized. Sometimes the enclosure is modified into an "H-frame" with the driver located on a wall dividing two open compartments. Such enclosures require some control over the radiated sound from the rear of the enclosure to achieve the desired response. This is usually done by mounting two drivers, one over the other, in a push-pull configuration.

Some of the speaker cabinets referred to as dipolar arrange the two poles at an angle of about 90 degrees rather than 180 degrees, especially for wall-mounted rear speakers (e.g. Jamo C-80-SUR, Castle dipoles, and Theophany S4).

== Advantages ==
An advantage of dipoles is that the sound is concentrated in the listening area due to the figure-of-eight polar response. This means that for a given output loudness, locations falling within the "dead-zone" of the speaker do not perceive as loud a sound as they would with more traditional enclosures. Dipole speakers are said to be better for rear speakers in surround-sound systems, although this is disputed (or at least success depends on factors such as room acoustics, type of music, and so on). The THX standard specifies dipoles for the surround speakers in home theater, but that part of the spec is often ignored in practice.

== Disadvantages ==
However, these enclosures are less efficient because, for the same driver, a dipole results in less sound pressure level than a closed or ported enclosure, and certainly far less than a properly designed horn. This means that the drivers mounted on a dipole enclosure must have large maximum excursions, large square areas, or both. One solution to these problems is to cross over to a closed or ported enclosure that handles the low frequencies. Another solution is to construct the dipole by means of a bipole with signal processing controlling the polar pattern. This enables switching between different polar patterns or varying the polar pattern and efficiency versus frequency and versus output level.
