= Dolby Stereo =

Sound format

- Product type: Sound format Surround sound Trademark
- Current owner: Dolby Laboratories
- Country: United States
- Introduced: 1976; 50 years ago
- Related brands: Dolby Digital
- Markets: Worldwide
- Website: Official website

Dolby Stereo is a sound format made by Dolby Laboratories. It is a unified brand for two completely different basic systems: the Dolby SVA (stereo variable-area) 1976 system used with optical sound tracks on 35mm film, and Dolby Stereo 70mm noise reduction on 6-channel magnetic soundtracks on 70mm prints.

Dolby SVA significantly improves the development of sound effects in films and theorization of sound design by Walter Murch. In 1982, it was adapted for home use as Dolby Surround when hi-fi capable consumer VCRs were introduced, and further improved in 1987 with the Dolby Pro Logic home decoding system.

== Dolby SVA ==
Of the two, Dolby SVA is by far the more significant, bringing high-quality stereo sound within the reach of virtually every cinema. Though 6-track magnetic stereo had been used in Cinerama films since 1952, and Fox had introduced 4-track stereo magnetic sound as part of the CinemaScope system in 1953, the technology had proved to be expensive and unreliable. Except in large cities, most movie theaters did not have facilities for playing back magnetic soundtracks, and a majority of films continued to be produced with mono optical soundtracks. Dolby SVA provided a method for putting high-quality stereo soundtracks on optical sound prints.

The optical soundtrack on a Dolby Stereo encoded 35 mm film carries not only left and right tracks for stereophonic sound, but also—through a matrix decoding system (Dolby Motion Picture matrix or Dolby MP) similar to that developed for "quadraphonic" or "quad" sound in the 1970s—a third center channel, and a fourth surround channel for speakers on the sides and rear of the theater for ambient sound and special effects. This yielded a total of four sound channels, as in the 4-track magnetic system, in the track space formerly allocated for one mono optical channel. Dolby also incorporated its A-Type noise reduction into the Dolby Stereo system.

=== History ===
Dolby Labs became involved in movie sound when film studios used Dolby A type noise reduction on studio magnetic film recordings. The first film to use Dolby noise reduction throughout the production process is A Clockwork Orange (1971), though much of the benefit was lost when it was released with a standard "Academy" optical soundtrack. This led to a proposal from Dolby that A type noise reduction be applied to the optical soundtrack on release prints.

Through the early 1970s, there was renewed interest in improving the quality of optical soundtracks, which had changed little since the 1930s. In particular, the infamous "Academy curve" (the standard frequency response for cinema playback of optical tracks as specified by the Academy of Motion Picture Arts and Sciences in 1938) was still in use. It involved a drastic roll-off in the high-frequency response of the theater system with the intention of reducing the audibility of noise and distortion. Dolby proposed replacing the Academy curve with Dolby A type noise reduction on the track. Starting with the 1974 film Callan, ten films were released with a Dolby encoded mono soundtrack. Theaters were equipped with a Dolby A type noise reduction module and a third-octave equalizer to equalize the electro-acoustic frequency response of the speakers/auditorium. It created a new international standard for cinema sound.

Though the system worked well, theater owners were reluctant to invest in the technology until stereo was added to the mix. The idea of putting a two-channel optical stereo soundtrack in the normal soundtrack area of a film print was not new; the stereo pioneer Alan Blumlein had made experimental stereophonic films using such a system as early as 1933, and J. G. Frayne of Westrex had proposed a similar system to the SMPTE in 1955.

By 1970, however, it was apparent that magnetic recording methods were not going to displace optical soundtracks on most release prints, and in the early 1970s Eastman Kodak revived the idea, as described by R. E. Uhlig in a paper presented to the SMPTE in 1972. Initially using a two-channel 16mm film recorder built for them by RCA, Kodak recorded two-channel stereo soundtracks much as Blumlein and Frayne had done before, but added Dolby noise reduction to improve the limited dynamic range available from these half-width tracks.

The remaining problem was the lack of a center channel, regarded as essential to lock dialogue to the middle of the screen. Uhlig discussed this issue in a follow-up paper. He considered the possibility of splitting the soundtrack area three ways to provide a third center channel, but dismissed it because of the negative impact it would have on dynamic range and the problems involved in converting film projectors. Instead he suggested feeding a center-channel speaker with a simple mix of the left and right channels; however, this is not entirely satisfactory as it degrades the stereo separation. After he brought his idea and worked with Dolby, Dolby SVA, a 35mm stereo variable-area optical encoding and decoding system, came up and later was adopted as an industry standard--ISO 2969.

At this time, Dolby joined forces with Kodak in developing this system. Dolby's solution to the center-channel problem was to use a "directionally enhanced" matrix decoder, based on those developed for domestic "Quadraphonic" systems, to recover a center channel from left and right channels recorded on the film. The matrix decoder originally employed for this used the Sansui QS matrix under license. This system was used for the 1975 Ken Russell film Lisztomania.

The matrix was then extended to provide a fourth channel for surround loudspeakers, allowing for a 4-channel system with the same speaker layout as the CinemaScope 4-track magnetic stereo system of the 1950s, but at a far lower cost.

Dolby Stereo, as this 4-channel system was now branded, was first used in 1976's A Star is Born. From spring 1979 onward, a new custom matrix replaced the Sansui QS matrix. It was first used in that year's Hair and Hurricane.

At first, Dolby Stereo equipment was installed mainly in larger theaters already equipped with amplifiers and speakers for CinemaScope 4-track stereo. But the success of 1977's Star Wars, which used the 4-channel system to great effect, encouraged owners of smaller theaters to install stereo equipment for the first time.

A key feature of this system was its backward compatibility: the same print could play anywhere, from an old drive-in theater with mono sound to a Dolby Stereo-equipped cinema, eliminating the need for a costly double inventory of prints for distribution. The success of Dolby Stereo resulted in the final demise of magnetic stereo on 35mm release prints. From then on, only 70mm prints used magnetic sound.

In the early 1990s, Dolby SR noise reduction began to replace Dolby A type NR in 35mm motion picture exhibition. All release prints encoded with Dolby Digital include a Dolby SR analog soundtrack, both as a backup in case the digital track malfunctions and for theaters not equipped for Dolby Digital playback.

As of 2021, Dolby Stereo's market share in the cinema space has declined rapidly with the advent of digital cinema. It serves as a backup for movie theaters still exhibiting 35mm film.

=== The Dolby Stereo Matrix ===
The Dolby Stereo Matrix (or Dolby 4:2:4 Matrix) combines four audio tracks into two physical channels. The original channels, Left (L), Center (C), Right (R), and Surround (S), are combined into the Left-total and Right-total (LtRt) channels by this formula:

Dolby Stereo Mix	Left (L)	Right (R)	Center (C)	Surround (S)
Left Total (Lt)	$1$	$0$	$\frac {1}{\sqrt 2}$	$+j \frac {1}{\sqrt 2}$
Right Total (Rt)	$0$	$1$	$\frac {1}{\sqrt 2}$	$-j \frac {1}{\sqrt 2}$

where j = 90° phase-shift

This center channel information is carried by both Lt and Rt in phase, and surround channel information by both Lt and Rt but out of phase. This gives good compatibility with both mono playback, which reproduces L, C and R from the mono speaker with C at a level 3dB higher than L or R, but surround information cancels out. It also gives good compatibility with two-channel stereo playback where C is reproduced from both left and right speakers to form a phantom center and surround is reproduced from both speakers but in a diffuse manner.

A simple 4-channel decoder could simply send the sum signal (L+R) to the center speaker, and the difference signal (L-R) to the surrounds. But such a decoder would provide poor separation between adjacent speaker channels, thus anything intended for the center speaker would also reproduce from left and right speakers only 3dB below the level in the center speaker. Similarly anything intended for the left speaker would be reproduced from both the center and surround speakers, again only 3dB below the level in the left speaker. There is, however, complete separation between left and right, and between center and surround channels.

To overcome this problem the cinema decoder uses so-called "logic" circuitry to improve the separation. The logic circuitry decides which speaker channel has the highest signal level and gives it priority, attenuating the signals fed to the adjacent channels. Because there already is complete separation between opposite channels there is no need to attenuate those, in effect the decoder switches between L and R priority and C and S priority. This places some limitations on mixing for Dolby Stereo and to ensure that sound mixers mixed soundtracks appropriately they would monitor the sound mix via a Dolby Stereo encoder and decoder in tandem. In addition to the logic circuitry the surround channel is also fed via a delay, adjustable up to 100 ms to suit auditoria of differing sizes, to ensure that any leakage of program material intended for left or right speakers into the surround channel is always heard first from the intended speaker. This exploits the "Precedence effect" to localize the sound to the intended direction.

=== Dolby Surround/Dolby Pro Logic (home decoders) ===
Dolby Surround is the earliest consumer version of Dolby's multichannel analog film sound format Dolby Stereo.

Due to the compatibility of the Dolby Stereo matrix with mono and stereo playback, when films originally made in Dolby Stereo were released on stereo domestic video formats - such as VHS-HiFi, laserdisc or broadcast on stereo TV - the original two-channel Dolby Stereo soundtrack could be used. Some domestic listeners were keen to hear these soundtracks in a manner more akin to how they would have sounded in the theater and for that market some manufacturers produced simplified surround decoders. To keep the cost down these decoders dispensed with a center speaker output and the logic circuitry found on the professional decoder, but did include the surround delay. To distinguish these decoders from the professional units found in cinemas they were given the name "Dolby Surround" decoders. The term "Dolby Surround" was also licensed by Dolby for use on TV programs or straight-to-video movies recorded through the Dolby Stereo matrix.

By the late 1980s integrated-circuit manufacturers were working on designing Dolby matrix decoders. A typical early example is the SSM-2125 from PMI. The SSM-2125 is a complete Dolby Stereo matrix decoder (except for the surround delay) on a single chip, it allowed domestic decoders which used the same logic system found in professional decoders to be marketed to the consumer. These decoders were thus named Dolby Pro Logic.

== Dolby Stereo 70 mm Six Track ==
Dolby Stereo 70 mm Six Track is the use of Dolby noise reduction on the six magnetic soundtracks of a 70 mm print. This was first used on some prints of the MGM film Logan's Run released in 1976.

The Todd-AO format was introduced in 1955 and included multi-channel magnetic sound from the start, it does not have an optical soundtrack, although in some 70mm prints have used a DTS digital track in place of the analogue magnetic one.

The original layout was for 5 front channels and one surround. But by the 1970s the use of the intermediate (left-center and right-center) tracks had been largely abandoned, these channels either being left blank, or filled with a simple mix of the adjacent channels. Dolby did not approve of this later practice, which results in loss of separation, but instead used these channels for LFE (low-frequency effects) utilizing the bass units of the otherwise redundant intermediate front speakers. Later the unused HF capacity of these channels was used to provide for stereo surround in place of the mono surround of the Todd-AO layout giving the modern 5.1 channel allocation retained by Dolby Digital.

== Ultra Stereo ==
By 1984, Dolby Stereo had a competitor. Ultra Stereo Labs had introduced a comparable stereo optical sound system, Ultra Stereo. Its cinema processor introduced improvements in matrix decoding and convolution matching with greater channel separation. An included balancing circuit compensated for film weave and some imbalances between the left and right tracks that previously caused voice leakage into the surround channel. The Ultra Stereo sound system won a 1984 Technical Achievement Award from the Academy of Motion Picture Arts and Sciences.
