= William Garity =

American inventor and audio engineer

- Born: April 2, 1899; Brooklyn, New York City, New York, U.S.
- Died: September 16, 1971 (aged 72); Los Angeles, California, U.S.
- Years active: 1921-1971

William E. Garity (April 2, 1899 – September 16, 1971) was an American inventor and audio engineer who attended the Pratt Institute before going to work for Lee De Forest around 1921. Garity worked with DeForest on the Phonofilm sound-on-film system until 1927, when Pat Powers hired Garity to develop a sound system closely based upon Phonofilm that Powers called Powers Cinephone.

Garity is best known for his employment at Walt Disney Studios, which used the Cinephone system in the late 1920s and early 30s. In 1937, also at the Disney Studios, Garity developed the multiplane camera first used to shoot Snow White and the Seven Dwarfs. Ub Iwerks, having left Disney to work at his own studio, developed an unrelated multiplane camera, during this same time period.

In 1940, Garity developed Fantasound, an early stereophonic surround sound system for Disney's Fantasia. After leaving the Disney studio, Garity later became vice president and production manager for Walter Lantz Productions. He was inducted in the Disney Legends program in 1999.
