= Dolby SR =

Analogue noise reduction system

- Product type: Surround sound
- Current owner: Dolby Laboratories
- Country: United States
- Introduced: 1986
- Related brands: Dolby Digital (1986-present)
- Markets: Worldwide
- Previous owners: Ultra Stereo
- Website: Dolby official website

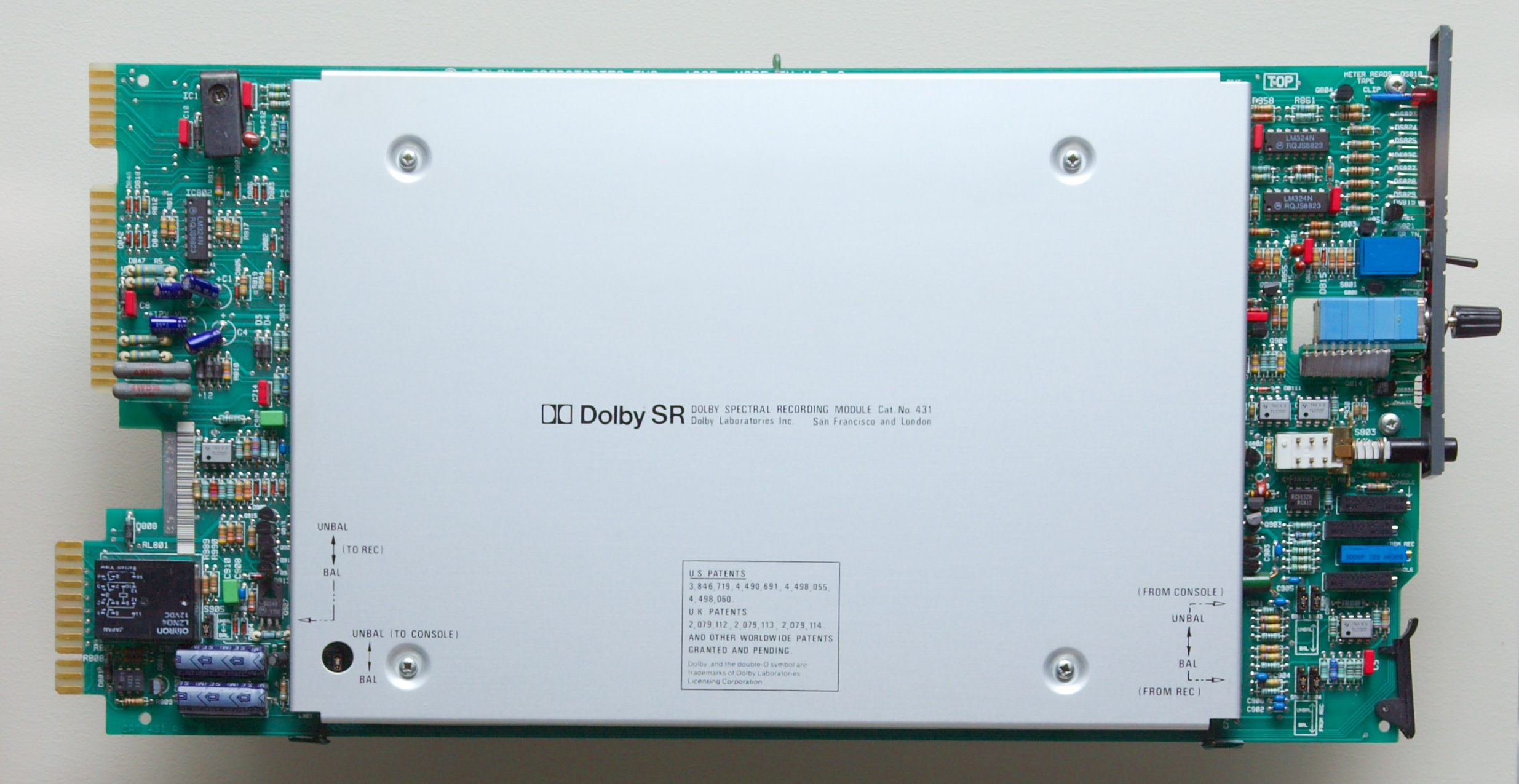
A Dolby SR card for a multitrack station.

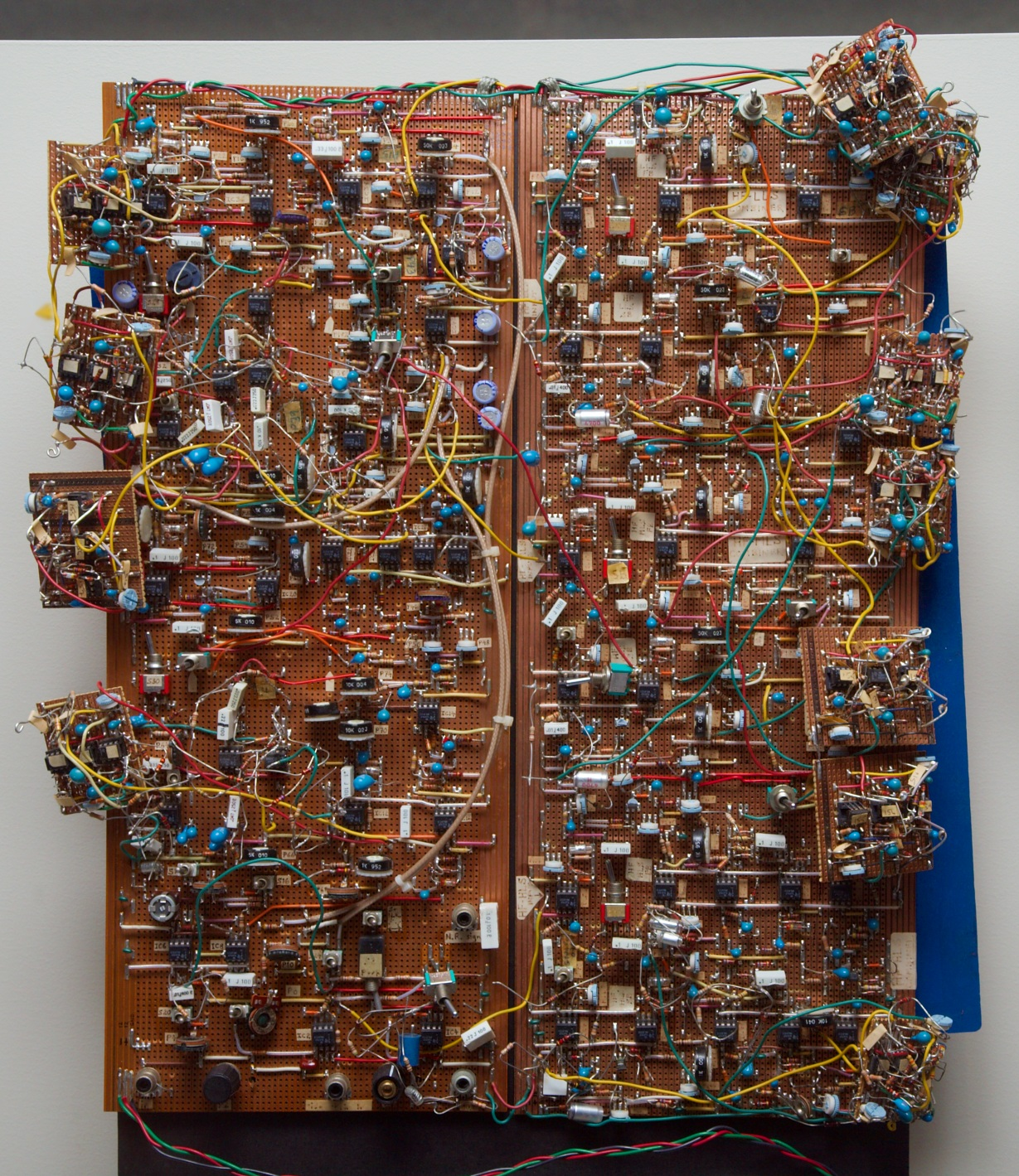
First prototype of Dolby SR encoder/decoder, created by Ray Dolby on perfboard.

The Dolby SR (Dolby Stereo Spectral Recording) is a noise reduction format developed by Dolby Laboratories. It has been in common use in professional audio since 1986 and in-theater audio since the late 1980s. It is a revised version of Dolby's earlier formats, combining aspects of Dolby A, B and C (e.g., sliding band and fixed band companders) to improve the dynamic range (i.e., the range in decibels between peak level and noise floor) of analogue recordings and transmissions by as much as 25 dB.

Dolby SR is used in many modern professional audio analogue (i.e., tape) recordings by recording and post-production engineers, broadcasters, and other audio professionals. It is used as the optical analog format on almost all 35mm film release prints, and is always the accompanying optical analog format when Dolby Digital is present.

Dolby SR was originally implemented in Dolby's Cat. 280 card, which was pin-compatible with the Cat. 22 A-type noise reduction card. Thus, devices that took the Cat. 22 card could be upgraded from A to SR by replacing the Cat. 22 with the Cat. 280. The Cat. 280 card functions in many devices, including Dolby's Model 361 frame. Some Dolby Theater processors require a special version, the Cat. 280T, which functions for decoding (playback) only.

== See also ==
- Dolby noise-reduction system
- Dolby Surround
- Dolby Digital
