= Dolby Voice =

Audio communication technology

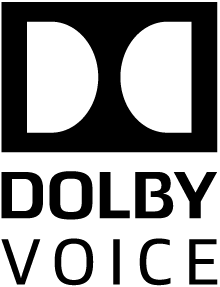
Logo

Dolby Voice is an audio communication technology developed by Dolby Laboratories since at least 2012. This solution is aimed at improving audio quality in virtual environments such as entreprise-level videoconferencing. It is implemented using commercially available hardware and/or software and uses the proprietary Dolby Voice Codec (DVC) audio codec.

== Features ==
This technology was created to improve audio quality, compared to other similar technologies through various audio processing features:

- a dynamic audio leveling to focus on the human voice, and to equalize participants audio power easing listening
- a spatialization of audio to improve voice clarity and reduce fatigue by preventing speech overlapping when multiple participants are talking at the same time
- a noise reduction to limit unwanted background sounds in noisy environments
- an echo reduction to limit audio reinjection when input and output devices are placed close together while, at the same time, avoiding to cut back on bandwidth usage and network resilience, through the use of heavy compression.

== Products ==
- Dolby.io platform
- Dolby Conference Phone
- Dolby Voice Room
- BlueJeans application
- Laptops
