= Dolby =

Audio technology company

Dolby Laboratories, Inc.

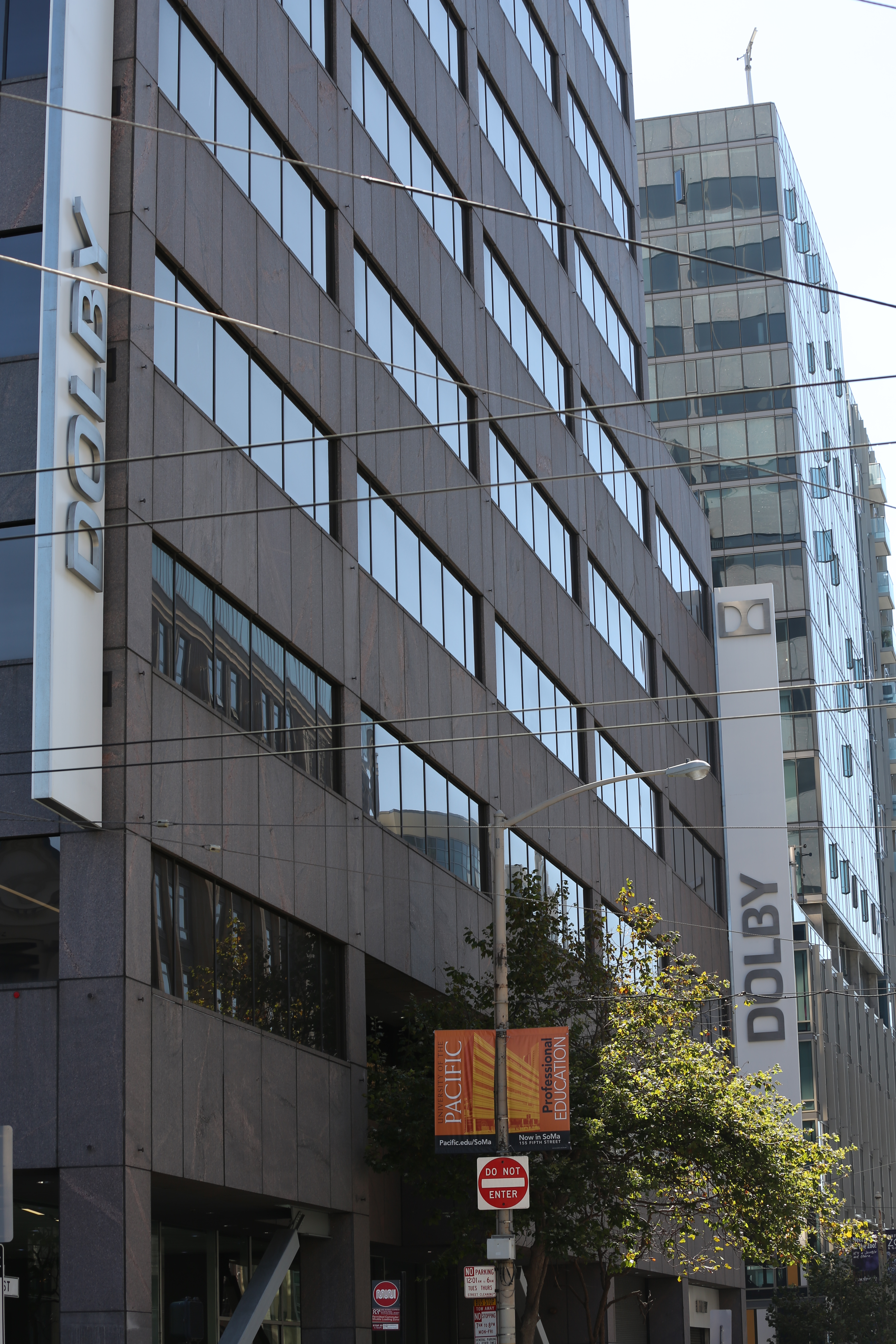
- Headquarters in San Francisco, California
- Type: Public
- Traded as: NYSE: DLB (Class A); S&P 400 component
- Industry: Audio encoding/compression; Audio noise reduction
- Founded: May 18, 1965; 61 years ago in London, England
- Founder: Ray Dolby
- Headquarters: Civic Center, San Francisco, California, U.S.
- Number of locations: 30+ (2015)
- Area served: Worldwide
- Key people: Peter Gotcher; (executive chairman); Kevin Yeaman; (president and CEO)
- Products: see Technologies: Brands; Dolby Atmos; Dolby Cinema; Dolby Digital; Dolby Surround/Pro Logic/Pro Logic II; Dolby SR; Dolby Stereo; Dolby Surround 7.1; Dolby noise-reduction system; Dolby Vision
- Services: Dolby Cinema
- Revenue: ▲US$1.35 billion (2025)
- Operating income: ▲US$265 million (2025)
- Net income: ▼US$255 million (2025)
- Total assets: ▲US$3.23 billion (2025)
- Total equity: ▲US$2.62 billion (2025)
- Number of employees: 2,051 (2025)
- Subsidiaries: Audistry; Doremi Labs; Via Licensing
- Website: dolby.com

Dolby Laboratories, Inc. (Dolby Labs or simply Dolby) is an American technology corporation specializing in audio noise reduction, audio encoding/compression, spatial audio, and high-dynamic-range television (HDR) imaging. Dolby licenses its technologies to consumer electronics manufacturers. Dolby is best known for their audio encoding format, Dolby Digital, which popularized the use of surround sound in media.

== History ==
Dolby Labs was founded by Ray Dolby (1933–2013) in London, England, in 1965. In the same year, he invented the Dolby Noise Reduction system, a form of audio signal processing for reducing the background hissing sound on cassette tape recordings. His first U.S. patent on the technology was filed in 1969, four years later. The method was first used by Decca Records in the UK. After this, other companies began purchasing Dolby's A301 technology, which was the professional noise reduction system used in recording, motion picture, broadcasting stations and communications networks. These companies include BBC, Pye, IBC, CBS Studios, RCA, and Granada.

He moved the company headquarters to the United States (San Francisco, California) in 1976. The first product Dolby Labs produced was the Dolby 301 unit which incorporated Type A Dolby Noise Reduction, a compander-based noise reduction system. These units were intended for use in professional recording studios.

Dolby was persuaded by Henry Kloss of KLH to manufacture a consumer version of his noise reduction. Dolby continued to work on companding systems and introduced Type B in 1968.

Dolby also sought to improve film sound. As the corporation's history explains:

Upon investigation, Dolby found that many of the limitations in optical sound stemmed directly from its significantly high background noise. To filter this noise, the high-frequency response of theatre playback systems was deliberately curtailed… To make matters worse, to increase dialogue intelligibility over such systems, sound mixers were recording soundtracks with so much high-frequency pre-emphasis that high distortion resulted.

The first film with Dolby sound was A Clockwork Orange (1971). The company was approached by Stanley Kubrick, who wanted to use Dolby's noise reduction system to facilitate the film's extensive mixing. The film went on to use Dolby noise reduction on all pre-mixes and masters, but a conventional optical soundtrack on release prints. Callan (1974) was the first film with a Dolby-encoded optical soundtrack. In 1975, Dolby released Dolby Stereo, which included a noise reduction system in addition to more audio channels (Dolby Stereo could actually contain additional center and surround channels matrixed from the left and right). The first film with a Dolby-encoded stereo optical soundtrack was Lisztomania (1975), although this only used an LCR (Left-Center-Right) encoding technique. The first true LCRS (Left-Center-Right-Surround) soundtrack was encoded on the movie A Star Is Born in 1976. In less than ten years, 6,000 cinemas worldwide were equipped to use Dolby Stereo sound. Dolby reworked the system slightly for home use and introduced Dolby Surround, which only extracted a surround channel, and the more impressive Dolby Pro Logic, which was the domestic equivalent of the theatrical Dolby Stereo. In 2005, Dolby's stereo 4-channel optical theater surround was inducted into the TECnology Hall of Fame, an honor given to "products and innovations that have had an enduring impact on the development of audio technology."

Dolby developed a digital surround sound compression scheme for the cinema. Dolby Stereo Digital (now called Dolby Digital) was first featured on the 1992 film Batman Returns. Introduced to the home theater market as Dolby AC-3 with the 1995 LaserDisc release of Clear and Present Danger, the format did not become widespread in the consumer market, partly because extra hardware was needed to make use of it, until it was adopted as part of the DVD specification. Dolby Digital is now found in the HDTV (ATSC) standard of the United States, DVD players, and many satellite-TV and cable-TV receivers. Dolby developed a digital surround sound compression scheme for the TV series The Simpsons.

On February 17, 2005, the company became public, offering its shares on the New York Stock Exchange, under the symbol DLB. On March 15, 2005, Dolby celebrated its 40th anniversary at the ShoWest 2005 Festival in San Francisco.

On January 8, 2007, Dolby announced the arrival of Dolby Volume at the International Consumer Electronics Show.

On June 18, 2010, Dolby introduced Dolby Surround 7.1, which added two rear surround channels to the 5.1 format. The first film to be released in this format was Pixar's Toy Story 3.

In April 2012, Dolby introduced Dolby Atmos, a new cinema technology adding overhead sound, first applied in Pixar's motion picture Brave. In the same year, Dolby bought the naming rights of Hollywood's Dolby Theatre, the venue of the annual Academy Awards ceremony. In July 2014, Dolby Laboratories announced plans to bring Atmos to home theater. The first television show to use the technology on disc was Game of Thrones.

On February 24, 2014, Dolby acquired Doremi Labs for $92.5 million in cash plus an additional $20 million in contingent consideration that may be earned over a four-year period.

In May 2015, Dolby reopened the Vine Theatre, Hollywood as a 70-seat showcase theater, known as Dolby @ Vine or Dolby Screening Room Hollywood Vine.

In May 2019, Dolby added Dolby Atmos to hundreds of newer songs in the music industry.

In May 2020, Dolby launched a developer platform, Dolby.io, aimed at providing developers self-service access to Dolby technologies through public APIs. It allows any person, organization, small and big, to integrate in their websites, apps, games, etc. features such as media enhancements and transcoding, spatial audio, high-quality video communication and low-latency streaming.

In May 2025, BBC Radio 4 broadcast Surrounded by Sound: Ray Dolby and the Art of Noise Reduction to mark Dolby Laboratories' 60th anniversary. This included interviews with his widow Dagmar and two of the first Dolby sound engineers, David Robinson and Ioan Allen (who still worked at the company), and Crimson Tide and Armageddon sound designer Midge Costin. A version of the programme was made in binaural sound.

== Technologies ==
=== Analog audio noise reduction ===
- Dolby A: professional noise reduction systems for analog reel-to-reel tape and cassettes.
- Dolby NR/B/C/S: consumer noise reduction systems for tapes and analog cassettes.
- Dolby SR (Spectral Recording): professional four-channel noise reduction system in use since 1986, which improves the dynamic range of analog recordings and transmissions by as much as 25 dB. Dolby SR is utilized by recording and post-production engineers, broadcasters, and other audio professionals. It is also the benchmark in analog film sound, being included today on nearly all 35 mm film prints. On films with digital soundtracks, the SR track is used in cinemas not equipped for digital playback, and it serves as a backup in case of problems with the digital track.
- Dolby FM: noise reduction system for FM broadcast radio. Dolby FM was tried by a few radio stations starting with WFMT in 1971. It used Dolby B, combined with 25 microsecond pre-emphasis. A small number of models of tuners and receivers were offered with the necessary decoder built in. In addition, a few cassette deck models appeared that allowed the deck's internal Dolby B decoder to be put in the line level pass-through path, permitting its use with Dolby FM broadcasts. The system was not successful and was on the decline by 1974.
- Dolby HX Pro: single-ended system used on high-end tape recorders to increase headroom. The recording bias is lowered as the high-frequency component of the signal being recorded increases, and vice versa. It does nothing to the actual audio that is being recorded, and it does not require a special decoder. Any HX Pro recorded tape will have, in theory, better sound on any deck.
- Dolby Advanced Audio: Dolby surround sound, locking preferred volume level, optimizes audio performance for specific PC models and lets turning up the volume to the built-in speakers without distorting the sound.

=== Audio encoding/compression ===
- Dolby Surround
- Dolby Digital (also known as AC-3) is a lossy audio compression format. It supports channel configurations from mono up to six discrete channels (referred to as "5.1"). This format first allowed and popularized surround sound. It was first developed for movie theater sound and spread to LaserDisc and DVD. It has been adopted in many broadcast formats including all North American digital television (ATSC), DVB-T, direct broadcast satellite, cable television, DTMB, IPTV, and surround sound radio services. It is also part of both the Blu-ray and the now-defunct HD DVD standards. Dolby Digital is used to enable surround sound output by most video game consoles. Several personal computers support converting all audio to Dolby Digital for output.
  - Dolby Digital EX: introduces a matrix-encoded center rear surround channel to Dolby Digital for 6.1 channel output. This center-rear channel is often split to two rear back speakers for 7.1 channel output.
  - Dolby Digital Plus (also known as E-AC-3) is a lossy audio codec based on Dolby Digital that is backward compatible, but more advanced. The DVD Forum has selected Dolby Digital Plus as a standard audio format for HD DVD video. It supports data rates up to 6 Mbit/s, an increase from Dolby Digital's 640 kbit/s maximum. On Blu-ray, Dolby Digital Plus is implemented differently, as a legacy 640 kbit/s Dolby Digital stream plus an additional stream to expand the surround sound, with a total bandwidth of approximately 1.7 Mbit/s. Dolby Digital Plus is also optimized for limited data-rate environments such as Digital broadcasting.
  - Dolby Digital Live is a real-time hardware encoding technology for interactive media such as video games. It converts any audio signals on a PC or game console into the 5.1-channel Dolby Digital format and transports it via a single S/PDIF cable. A similar technology known as DTS Connect is available from competitor DTS.
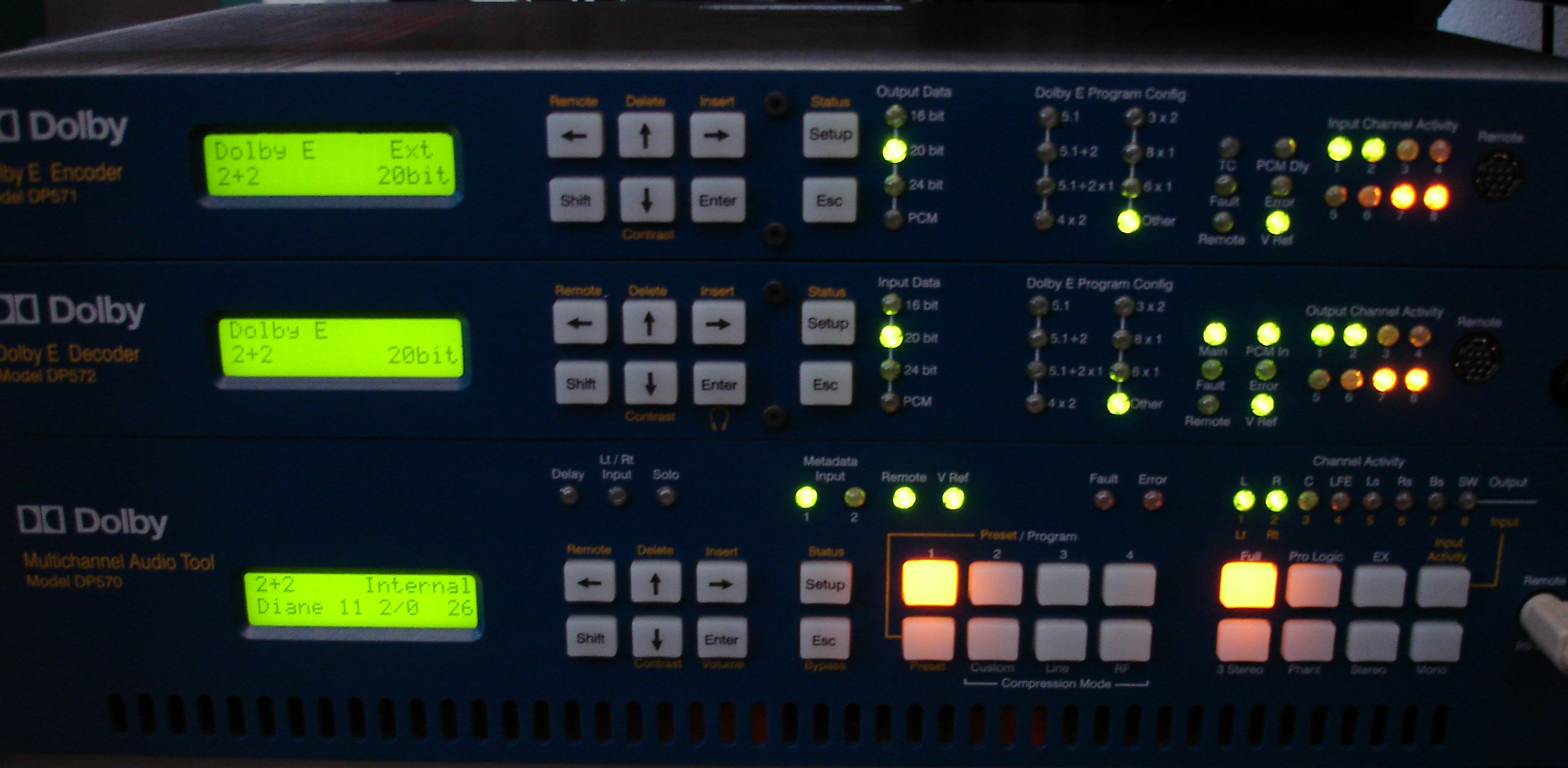
- Dolby E selected hardware
  Dolby E: professional coding system optimized for the distribution of surround and multichannel audio through digital two-channel post-production and broadcasting infrastructures, or for recording surround audio on two audio tracks of conventional digital video tapes, video servers, communication links, switchers, and routers. The Dolby E signal does not reach viewers at home. It is transcoded to Dolby Digital at a lower data rate for final DTV transmission.
- Dolby Stereo (also known as Stereo A): original analog optical technology developed for 35 mm prints and is encoded with four sound channels: Left/Center/Right (which are located behind the screen) and Surround (which is heard over speakers on the sides and rear of the theatre) for ambient sound and special effects. This technology also employs A-type or SR-type noise reduction, listed above with regards to analog cassette tapes. See also Dolby Surround
- Dolby TrueHD: Offers bit-for-bit sound reproduction identical to the studio master. Over seven full-range 24-bit/96 kHz discrete channels are supported (plus an LFE channel, making it 7.1 surround) along with the HDMI interface. Theoretically, Dolby TrueHD can support more channels, but this number has been limited to 8 for HD DVD and Blu-ray Disc.
- Dolby Pulse: released in 2009, it is identical to the HE-AAC v2 codec except for the addition of Dolby metadata, which is common for Dolby's other digital audio codecs. This metadata "ensures consistency of broadcast quality."
- Dolby AC-4 is a lossy audio compression format that can contain audio channels and/or audio objects.
- Dolby Atmos is a suite of technologies for immersive audio having both horizontal and vertical sound placement, using a combination of channel and object-based mixing and delivery. It was first introduced in cinemas with Brave. The first game released with Dolby Atmos audio was Star Wars Battlefront. The means of delivering the channels and objects differ given the technical limitations across different media, and the target platform. Dolby Atmos is not a codec; on the consumer market, pre-recorded Dolby Atmos is delivered as an extension to a Dolby TrueHD, Dolby Digital Plus, or Dolby AC-4 stream.

=== Audio processing ===
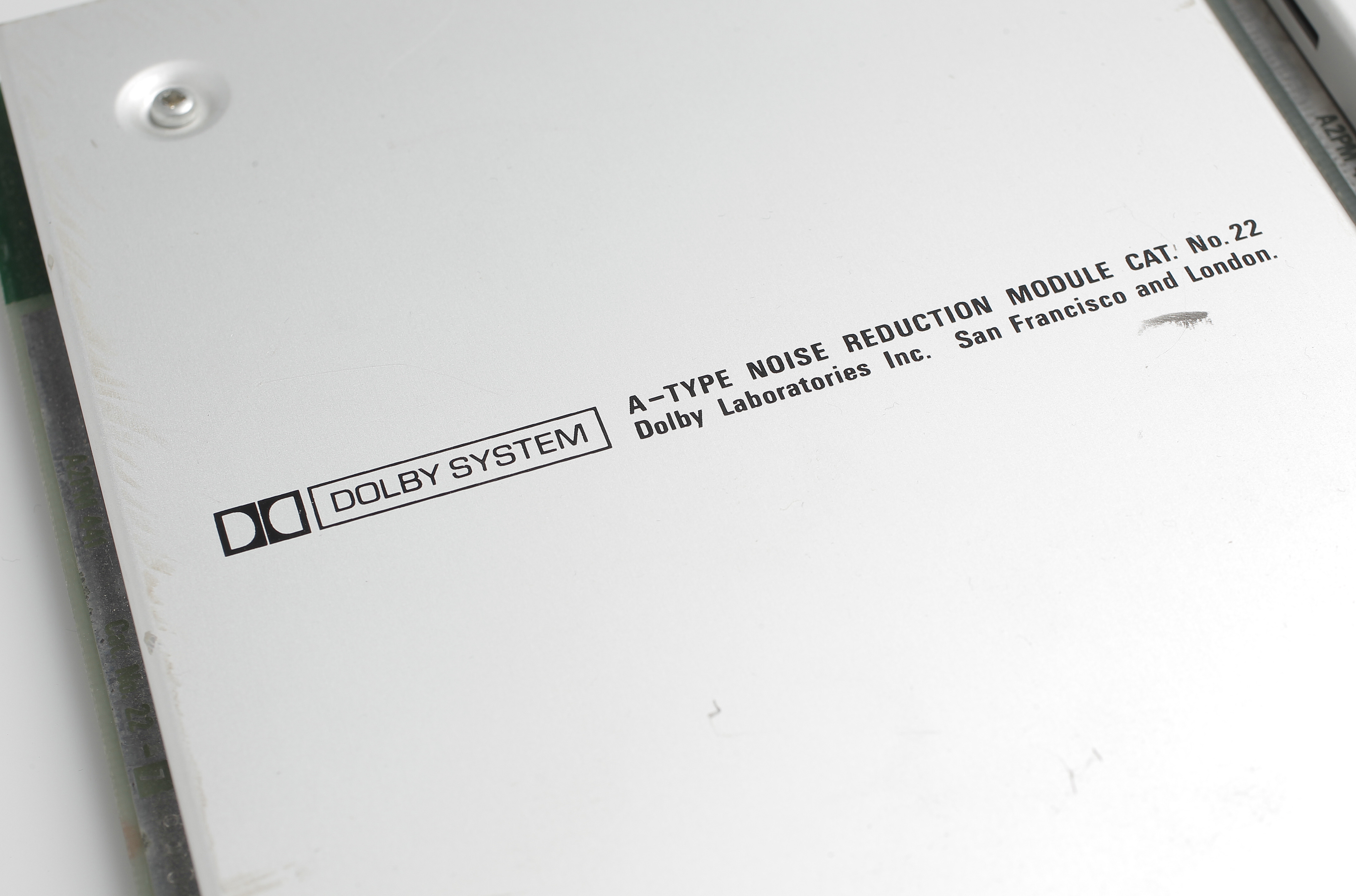
Dolby system A-type decoder

- Dolby Headphone: an implementation of virtual surround, simulating 5.1 surround sound in a standard pair of stereo headphones.
- Dolby Virtual Speaker: simulates 5.1 surround sound in a setup of two standard stereo speakers.
- Dolby Surround, Dolby Pro Logic, Dolby Pro Logic II, Dolby Pro Logic IIx, and Dolby Pro Logic IIz: these decoders expand sound to a greater number of channels. All can decode surround sound that has been matrixed into two channels; some can expand surround sound to a greater number of speakers than the original source material. See the referenced articles for more details on each decoder.
- Audistry: sound enhancement technologies.
- Dolby Volume: reduces volume level changes.
- Dolby Mobile: A version of Dolby's surround sound technology specifically designed for mobile phones, notably the HTC Desire HD, LG Arena and LG Renoir.
- Dolby Audio Plug-in for Android: An API packaged as a Java Library that allows Android Developers to take advantage of Dolby Digital Plus Technology embedded into mobile and tablet devices, notably the Fire HD, Fire HDX, and Samsung Galaxy Tab 3 series.
- Dolby Voice: Hardware and software products for enterprise-level web conferencing.

=== Video processing ===
- Dolby Contrast provides enhanced image contrast to LCD screens with LED backlight units by means of local dimming.
- Perceptual Quantizer (PQ), published by SMPTE as SMPTE ST 2084, is a transfer function that allows for the display of high dynamic range (HDR) video with a luminance level of up to 10,000 cd/m^{2} and can be used with the Rec. 2020 color space. On August 27, 2015, the Consumer Electronics Association announced the HDR10 Media Profile which uses the Rec. 2020 color space, SMPTE ST 2084, and a bit depth of 10-bits. On August 2, 2016, Microsoft released the Windows 10 Anniversary Update, which supports the HDR10 format with PQ (ST 2084) transfer function and Rec.2020 color space.
- Dolby Vision is a content mastering and delivery format similar to the HDR10 media profile. It supports both high dynamic range (HDR) and wide color gamut (ITU-R Rec. 2020 and 2100) at all stages from content creation and production to transmission and playback. Dolby Vision includes the Perceptual Quantizier (SMPTE ST-2084) electro-optical transfer function and supports displays with up to 10,000-nit maximum brightness (4,000-nit in practice). It also provides up to 8K resolution and color depth of up to 12-bits (backwards compatible with current 8-bit and 10-bit displays). Dolby Vision can encode mastering display colorimetry information using static metadata (SMPTE ST 2086) and dynamic metadata (SMPTE ST 2094–10, Dolby format) for each scene or frame of a video. Examples of Ultra HD (UHD) Dolby Vision are available in TV, monitor, mobile devices and theater. Dolby Vision content can be delivered on Ultra HD Blu-ray discs, over conventional broadcasting, OTT, and online streaming media services. Dolby Vision metadata can be carried via HDMI interface versions 1.4b and above. It also supports IPTPQc2 color space, that is similar to ICtCp. Dolby Vision IQ is an update designed to optimize Dolby Vision content according to the brightness of the room.
- ICtCp provides an improved color representation that is designed for high dynamic range (HDR) and wide color gamut (WCG). An improved constant luminance is an advantage for color processing operations such as chroma subsampling and gamut mapping where only color information is changed. ICtCp is based on a modification of IPT called ICaCb.

=== Digital cinema ===
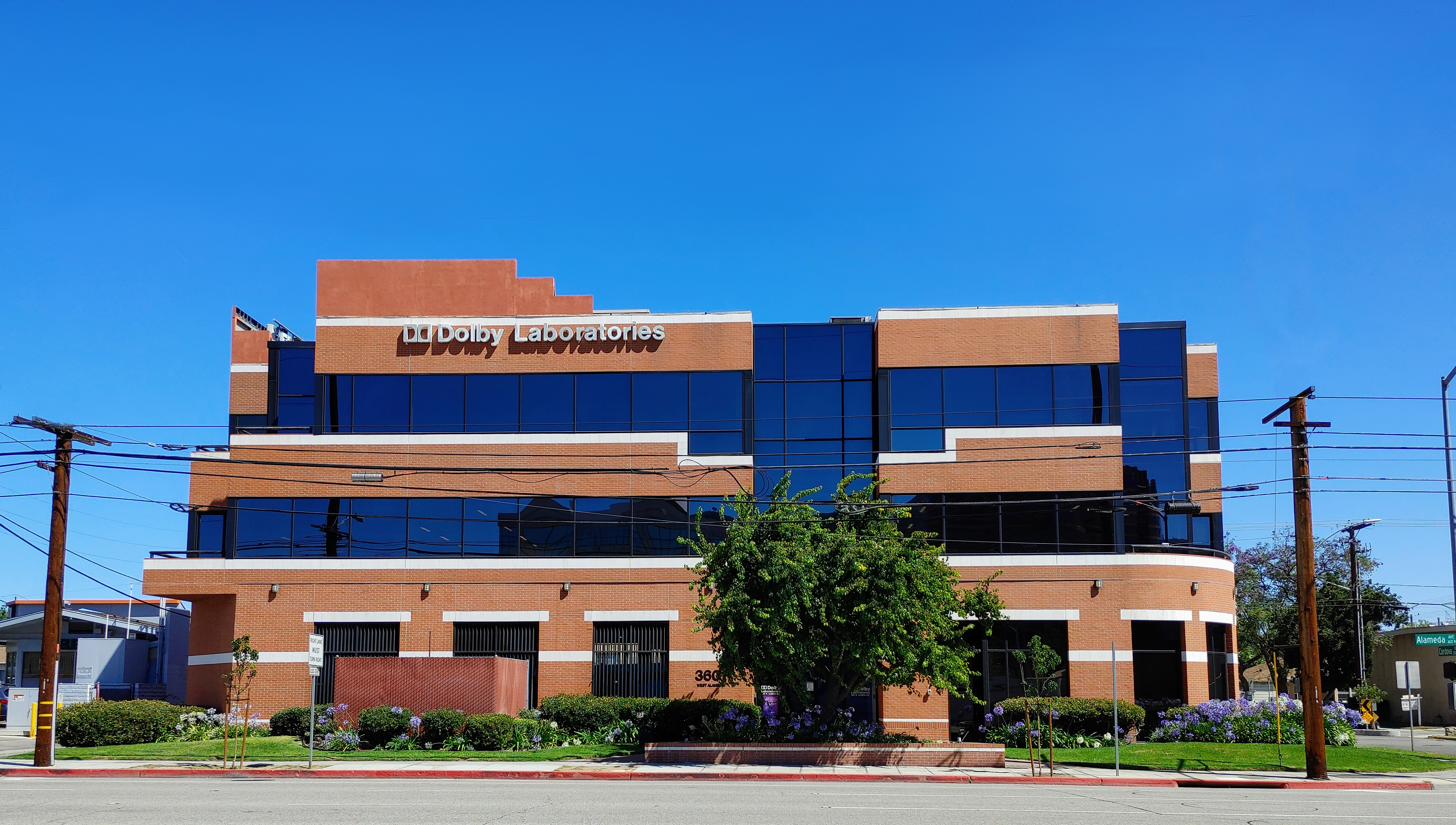
Dolby Laboratories Screening Rooms in Burbank, California

- Dolby Digital Cinema
- Dolby Surround 7.1, first introduced theatrically with Toy Story 3, in 2010.
- Dolby 3D
- Dolby Atmos
- Dolby Cinema, a premium cinema concept developed by Dolby Laboratories as a direct competitor to IMAX.

=== Live sound ===
- Dolby Lake Processor - as of 2009, all Lake products are owned by Lab Gruppen.

Over the years Dolby has introduced several surround sound systems. Their differences are explained below.

== Dolby matrix surround systems ==
Decoder	Encoder	Year	Description	Channels
Dolby Stereo	Dolby MP Matrix	1975	Cinema use with optical technology. Uses Dolby A for noise reduction. 4:2 encoded for 35mm film and 2:4 decoded back to 4.0 by Dolby Stereo Processor. Discrete Magnetic 6-Track variant for 70mm.	FL FR with C and MonoSurround matrixed
Dolby Surround	"	1982	Consumer Variant of Dolby Stereo. Original Decoder utilized a simple passive L-R Circuit with Delay and Phantom Center for 3-Channel Decoding.	FL FR and MonoSurround matrixed
Dolby Stereo SR	Dolby MP Matrix	1986	Addition of Dolby SR Noise Reduction to Dolby Stereo for Enhanced Fidelity and Dynamic Range.	FL FR with C and MonoSurround matrixed
Dolby Pro Logic	"	1986 Modern; 1987	Reference Active Matrix 2:4 Decoder (Cat No. 150) for Dolby Stereo and Dolby Surround. Accurately Decodes Lt/Rt to Recover the LCRS 4.0 Surround.	FL FR with C and MonoSurround matrixed
Dolby Pro Logic II	N/A	2000	Upmixes non-Encoded Stereo to Surround 5.1. Can also be used to decode Dolby Surround for 5.1 Playback. Consumer Decoders often include specific Movie, Music, or Game modes.	FL FR C SL SR SUB
Dolby Pro Logic IIx	N/A	2002	Extension to PLII. Enhancement of either Stereo, Dolby Surround, Dolby Digital 5.1 to 6.1 or 7.1. Decodes Dolby Digital EX to 6.1 or 7.1. Retains Movie, Music, or Game modes in Consumer Products.	FL FR C SL SR SUB Left Back and Right Back
Dolby Pro Logic IIz	N/A	2009	Extension to PLIIx. Decodes Stereo, Dolby Surround or Discrete 5.1/6.1/7.1 to 7.1 Height or Full 9.1 with the addition of Front Height Channels. Last Pro Logic Branded Decoder from Dolby.	L, C, R, Lss, Rss (side surrounds), Lrs, Rrs (rear surrounds), LFE, Lvh and Rvh
Dolby Surround (2014)	N/A	2014	Dolby reintroduced the Dolby Surround terminology in 2014. The term now refers to a new frequency-domain decoder/upmixer. Dolby Surround is a complete replacement for Pro Logic; it takes in stereo (discrete or matrixed), 5.1 and 7.1 inputs to play over a wide range of output configurations including those with height channels.	

== Dolby discrete surround systems ==
Format	Core Codec	Year	Description	Channels
Dolby Digital	AC-3	1986 Modern; 1992 Film; 1995 Laser Disc	Discrete channel encoder/decoder. Stereo output can be generated from the 5 program channels using Pro Logic encoding. This allows systems that are limited to stereo output to carry surround sound.	L R C Ls Rs LFE
Dolby Digital Surround EX	AC-3	1999	6.1 or 7.1 Surround via Matrix Encoding of Ls/Rs Channels in 5.1. Remains backwards compatible with standard 5.1 digital.	L R C Ls Rs LFE. Matrix decoding can derive Cs (mono surround) or Lrs, Rrs (stereo surrounds) from the Ls and Rs signals
Dolby TrueHD	MLP	2006	Lossless compression codec; supports 44.1 kHz to 192 kHz sampling frequency up to 24-bit word length; supports variable data rate up to 18 Mbit/s; maximum channel support is 16 channels as presently deployed. Higher bitrate than Dolby Digital Plus. Blu-ray Disc channel support up to eight channels of 96 kHz/24-bit audio; six channels (5.1) up to 192 kHz/24-bit; and two- to six-channel support up to 192 kHz/24-bit maximum bit rate up to the maximum of 18 Mbit/s.	
Dolby Digital Plus	Enhanced AC-3	2006	Lossy compression codec; 48 kHz sampling frequency, 20-bit word length; supports data rates of 32 kbit/s – 6 Mbit/s, scalable, including 768 kbit/s – 1.5 Mbit/s on high-definition optical discs, typically, and 256 kbit/s for broadcast and online. 1.0- to 7.1-channel support for current media applications; extensible to 16 channels; discrete. Backward compatible with Dolby Digital through S/PDIF connection up to 640 kbit/s. Supports Dolby Metadata.	L R C Lss Rss LFE Lrs Rrs
Dolby Surround 7.1	N/A	2010	New sound format for cinema soundtracks that adds two additional surround channels.	L, C, R, Lss, Rss (side surrounds), Lrs, Rrs (rear surrounds), LFE
Dolby Atmos	Cinema: SSLAC. Consumer: Dolby Digital Plus-JOC, MLP, AC-4.	2012	Expands on existing surround sound formats by adding top surround channels and audio objects. Each audio object consists of a mono audio signal plus metadata that describes the sound location, size, and other rendering control parameters. An object renderer is used to convert the audio objects to output channel signals. The use of audio objects allows a sound to be described independently of any specific loudspeaker configuration. For cinema distribution, all audio is losslessly encoded as PCM or SSLAC (Samplerate Scalable Lossless Audio Coding).	Cinema soundtrack channels: L, R, C, LFE, Lss, Rss (side surrounds), Lrs, Rrs (rear surrounds), Lts, Rts (top surrounds). Note: the number and intended location of _output_ channels is defined at playback based on the available loudspeakers.

== ATSC controversy ==
Dolby Digital AC-3 is used as the audio codec for the ATSC standards, though it was standardized as A/52 by the ATSC. It allows the transport of up to five channels of sound with a sixth channel for low-frequency effects (the so-called "5.1" configuration). In contrast, Japanese ISDB HDTV broadcasts use MPEG's Advanced Audio Coding (AAC) as the audio codec, which also allows 5.1 audio output. DVB allows both.

MPEG-2 audio was a contender for the ATSC standard during the "Grand Alliance" shootout, but lost out to Dolby AC-3. The Grand Alliance issued a statement finding the MPEG-2 system to be "essentially equivalent" to Dolby, but only after the Dolby selection had been made. Later, a story emerged that MIT had entered into an agreement with Dolby whereupon the university would be awarded a large sum of money if the MPEG-2 system was rejected. Dolby also offered an incentive for Zenith to switch their vote (which they did); however, it is unknown whether they accepted the offer.

== See also ==
- CX (analog noise reduction competitor)
- dbx (analog noise reduction competitor)
- High Com (analog noise reduction competitor)
- DTS (digital soundspace competitor)
- Meridian Lossless Packing (lossless coding for DVD-Audio)
- SRS Labs (surround sound competitor)
- Beats Audio (digital soundspace competitor)
- Sony Dynamic Digital Sound (digital soundspace competitor)
- Dolby Theatre
- THX
- On Air (streaming service) (Live Dolby Vision & Dolby Atmos concerts)
