= Center channel =

Audio channel

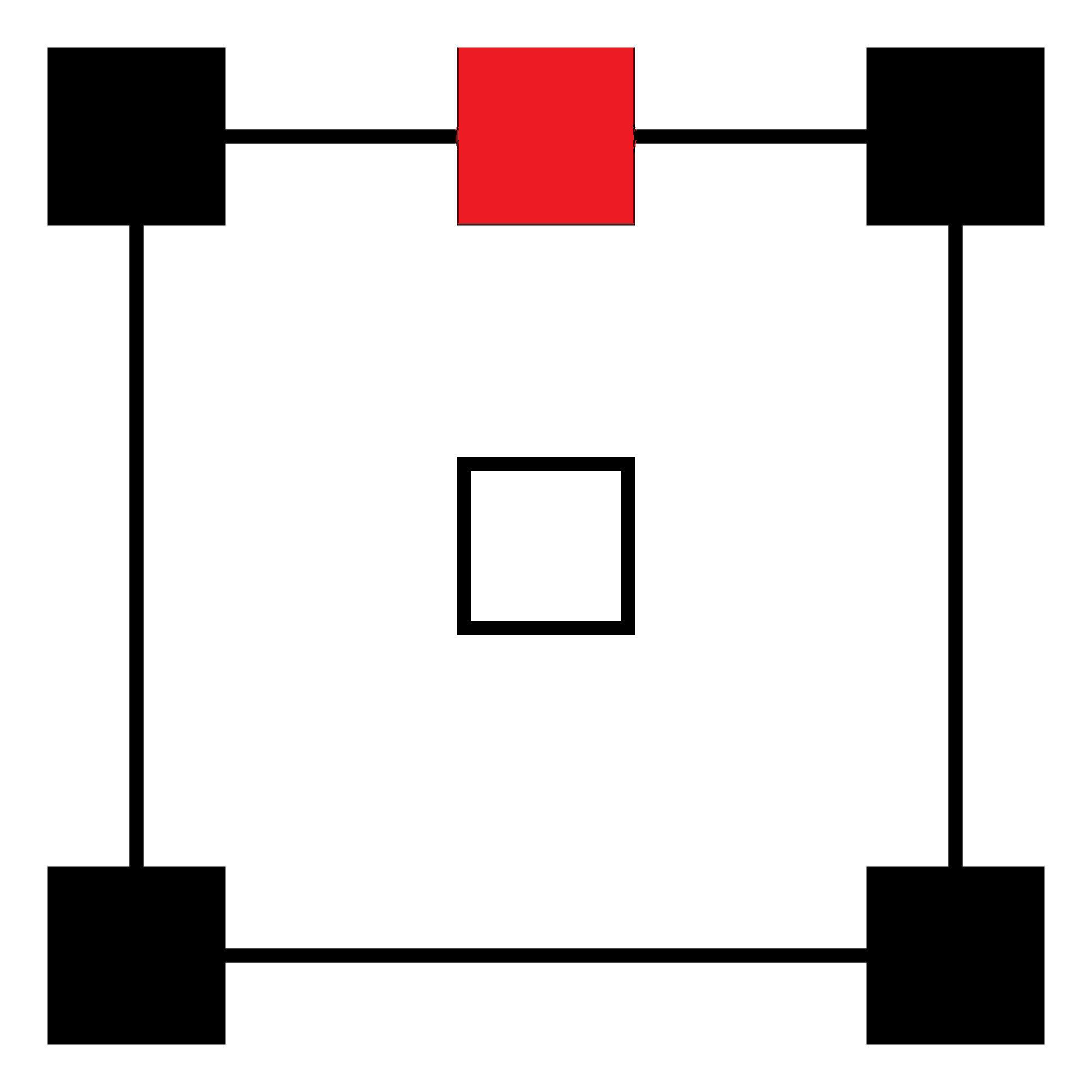
Center channel in a 5.1 speaker setup shown in red

Center channel refers to an audio channel common to many surround sound formats. It is the channel that is mostly, or fully, dedicated to the reproduction of the dialogue of an audiovisual program. The speaker(s) connected to the center channel are placed in the center of and behind the perforated projection screen, to give the effect that sounds from the center channel are coming from the screen. In many home surround sound units, the center channel is positioned above or below the video screen.

In the post-production process of filmmaking and video production sound editing, dialogue can be mapped to other speakers when story action and direction require it, such as when the person talking is off-screen.

In material without accompanying visuals (e.g. music), the center channel simply reproduces sound intended to come from immediately in front of the listener, which usually includes the lead vocals.

The center channel also anchors the sound field, eliminating phantom images such as those that plagued early matrixed quadraphonic sound if the speakers were not precisely placed. The center channel eliminates the need to create a phantom center with left and right stereo speakers. The center channel provides image stabling effects and is considered the most important channel for film production.

== History ==
The need for a center speaker to locate screen-centered sounds has been recognized since the Bell Labs experiments in stereo sound from the 1930s, and multi-channel cinema sound systems, starting with the first commercial stereophonic film (Fantasia-1941) have always included one. Post-war stereo sound in theaters initially came from separate magnetic film reproducers synchronized to the picture, but in the 1950s systems using magnetic stripes on the film itself came into use. Cinemascope used four such tracks (left, center, right and surround), and the subsequent Todd-AO 70 mm system used six (left, left-center, center, right-center and right, plus a single surround channel). Unfortunately, these magnetic systems were not only very expensive but were also unreliable and so were little used, the industry preferring to stay with the tried, tested, and economical mono optical track.

Dolby Stereo was introduced by Dolby Laboratories in 1975. It divided the existing soundtrack area of a 35 mm film print into two, allowing a two-channel recording. Each of these two channels used Dolby A-type noise reduction (later replaced by Dolby SR type). In addition a matrix, similar in principle to those used for the existing matrix-type quadraphonic systems, allowed the audio for left, center and right speakers, plus a single surround channel to be carried by the two tracks. Thus Dolby Stereo provided a similar stereo performance to that previously only available in the cinema by the magnetic tracks on 4-track Cinemascope or 6-track Todd-AO 70 mm formats, but at far lower cost.

In early surround formats, vocals would often be spread over the three front channels. The 1977 release of Star Wars featured a six-track stereo mix developed by Dolby called "baby boom" that consolidated vocals to the center channel, while the left and right channels were used to increase the bass response. In recent years digital multi-channel sound systems, such as Dolby Digital and DTS, have become available which provide 6 or 8 discrete audio channels providing for not only the usual three screen speakers but also 2 or 4 groups of surround speakers and a sub-woofer.

== Center focus or dialog enhancement ==
Many AV receivers have a center focus or dialog enhancement option that provides options for dialogue reproduction, as well as the overall content mapped to the center and front channels. Common settings include modes that map dialogue strictly to the center channel (to the best ability of the decoder), modes that emphasize vocals for clear dialogue, and modes that mix the center and front channels, mapping some vocals to the front channels, and some non-vocal audio content to the center channel. It may also simply raise the volume level of the center channel. DTS:X processing may include dialog control, the ability to isolate and control dialog levels independent of other ambient noises.

== Rear/back center channel ==
6.1 channel surround systems such as Dolby Pro Logic IIx, Dolby Digital EX and DTS-ES use a single rear surround channel in addition to the traditional left and right surround channels.
