= Fantasound =

Sound reproduction system

Fantasound was a sound reproduction system developed by engineers of Walt Disney Studios and RCA for Walt Disney's 1940 animated film Fantasia, the first commercial film released in stereo.

== Origins ==
Walt Disney's cartoon character Mickey Mouse entered a decline in popularity in the mid-1930s. Disney devised a comeback appearance for Mickey in 1936 with The Sorcerer's Apprentice, a more elaborate edition of the animated Silly Symphonies series set to the music of The Sorcerer's Apprentice by Paul Dukas. Disney met conductor Leopold Stokowski in late 1937 at Chasen's, a noted Hollywood restaurant, and Stokowski agreed to conduct the piece at no cost. Stokowski was an enthusiast for new and improved methods of sound reproduction and had already participated in experimental stereophonic sound recordings in 1931 and 1932, and a live, long-distance demonstration of multi-channel sound a year later.

== Recording the Fantasia soundtrack, 1938–39 ==
=== The Sorcerer's Apprentice ===
In January 1938, over 100 musicians assembled at Culver Studios in California for the recording of the nine-minute Dukas piece. The plan was to create a multi-track recording that allowed the separation of sound channels which would allow the dynamic balance of the music to be adjusted on reproduction. The stage was altered acoustically with five double plywood partitions that separated the sections of the orchestra, creating the world's first sound baffles. Although a satisfactory recording was made, in the days before widespread use of headphones and click tracks to control the speed, the musicians could not hear the other instruments clearly enough and this affected the tempo of the piece. Poor control over the separation of low-frequency sounds presented a further problem on playback of the music.

As production costs for The Sorcerer's Apprentice surpassed $125,000, it became clear to Disney that it would not recoup costs as a short. In February 1938, he decided to expand the concept and start on a feature-length film consisting of several animated segments named The Concert Feature.

=== Academy of Music sessions ===
A year after recording The Sorcerer's Apprentice, Stokowski signed an 18-month contract with Disney to conduct the remaining pieces for Fantasia and the process began in earnest. Fascinated with the rich sound he heard from the playbacks at Culver Studios, Disney felt the conventional sound systems at the time sounded too tinny and inadequate for the experience he wanted Fantasia to be. "We know...that music emerging from one speaker behind the screen sounds thin, tinkly and strained. We wanted to reproduce such beautiful masterpieces...so that audiences would feel as though they were standing at the podium with Stokowski," he said. The goal was to reproduce a full symphony orchestra with its normal volume range and acoustic output in the theatre. The set-up used for the recording of The Sorcerer's Apprentice was abandoned, and it was decided to record with the Philadelphia Orchestra, which Stokowski had directed from 1912 to 1938, at the Academy of Music concert hall in Philadelphia, the orchestra's home known for its good acoustics.

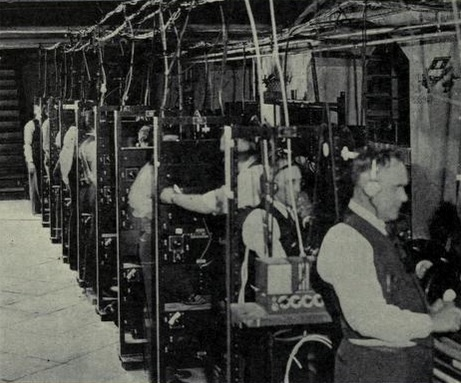
Staff operating the nine sound channels located in the hall's basement

The recording for Fantasia began in April 1939 and lasted seven weeks. In the sessions, 33 microphones placed around the orchestra captured the music which was transferred onto eight optical recording machines located in the hall's basement. Several safety measures were enforced to prevent the risk of fire as the Academy was constructed of wood. A maximum of 18 rolls of raw nitrate film stock were allowed in the venue at any one time, with a film delivery truck parked outside the hall being converted into a storage unit for a sufficient quantity of film. Six of the channels recorded different sections of the orchestra which provided a "close-up" of the instruments – cellos and basses, violins, violas, brass, woodwinds and timpani – while the seventh channel recorded a mixture of the first six and the eighth captured the overall sound of the orchestra at a distance. A ninth channel provided the click-track function to help the animators time their drawings to the music.

Each microphone was channeled to a central switching panel, where an operator would read the score and mute those that were not in use to keep noise and leakage to a minimum. Engineers in the basement used headphones for sound mixing and cathode ray oscilloscopes for level indicators, while those who picked up the distant orchestra sound used horn monitoring. In the 42 days of sessions, over ninety miles of sound track were recorded. After being developed, the film was shipped to the Disney studios in Burbank, California, where tone and other adjustments were made prior to mastering. The nine recorded sound tracks were then mixed into four: three for the music, voices and special effects and the fourth for control of the volume of the first three.

== Development and testing, 1939–40 ==
=== Pan pot and togad device ===
The average monaural sound systems around the time of the production of Fantasia had a number of disadvantages. Their limited range in volume was ineffective as symphonic music was impaired by excessive ground noise and amplitude distortion. Their single point source of sound, though suitable for dialogue and action at the centre of the screen, caused music and sound effects to suffer from acoustic phase distortion which is absent when sound originates from multiple sources. Led by William E. Garity, the chief audio engineer at the Disney studios, technicians developed a multi-channel reproduction system that was dubbed Fantasound, a process that was to be a desirable alternative sound system.

The first task was to create the illusion of sound "moving" across neighboring speakers. It was found that by placing two speakers roughly 20 feet apart, it was possible to produce a "moving" sound, but the effect could not be achieved through simple volume control. The problem was solved with a three-circuit differential junction network named the "pan pot" (panoramic potentiometer), that allowed sound to progressively travel using constant fades with a left, center and right speaker configuration. The second issue was dynamic range, the difference in volume between the loudest and quietest sounds. The dynamic range of typical film soundtracks at the time was limited to a poor signal-to-noise ratio of about 40 dB. This was tackled by increasing the volume during loud passages and reducing it during quiet ones, to which the dynamic range would increase. A tone-operated gain-adjusting device, or "Togad," was built that varied the volume of the replayed sound under the control of a tone of varying amplitude. This device was an early predecessor of the automated mix-down systems found in modern recording studios.

=== Fantasound set-ups ===
Ten different Fantasound setups were built and tested during its development. As many as several hundred designs were detailed on paper, each with different equipment combinations. The first setup that was constructed, the Mark I system, used a left, center and right speaker placed across the stage plus one in each corner at the back of the auditorium. It used two sound channels, one directed at the stage center (or "screen") speaker, while the second could travel around the remaining four across the room smoothly using a manually controlled four-circuit panpot. The following Mark II configuration used a third sound channel and three additional speakers, one placed on each side wall of the house and a third placed in the middle of the ceiling, all with a manual six-circuit panpot. By the time the Mark II system was devised, the control of the sound system was too complex for a single operator. To solve that difficulty, the Mark III system was developed to study the effects of a pilot tone-control track. The configuration was a single-channel Togad expander, controlled by either an oscillator or a tone track. The Mark IV system was identical to the eight-speaker, three-track Mark II system except that a Togad replaced manual control. It was installed at Disney's Hyperion studios in the summer of 1939 and was used for sound and music department research until Disney's relocation to Burbank in 1940. The equipment for this system required a floor space of about 35 feet by 4 feet and used nearly 400 vacuum tubes.

The Mark V system, the first installed at Burbank, was in operation for one day. Though the equipment operated correctly, the system failed because the personnel could not remember the correct configuration from one rehearsal to the next. The crew then developed the simpler Mark VI setup that consisted of three-stage speakers, three program tracks and a three-tone control track. The first serious dubbing of Fantasia was attempted on this system. The Mark VII was the first to be manufactured by RCA that closely resembled the Mark VI, but included tone rectifier modifications. The Mark VIII system was a rearranged version of the Mark VII. A log-log tone rectifier designed by RCA replaced the linear tone rectifier used in the Mark VII. The second dubbing of Fantasia was done through this system. Following the installation of a stand-by channel, this equipment was installed in New York City for the film's premiere. Two further systems were developed after the film's opening. The arrangement of the Mark IX setup was changed and two sets of rear speakers were manually switched in to supplement or replace the left and right front speakers at several points in the film. In the Mark X, the switching and level changes in the rear speakers are done automatically using a thyratron and mechanical relay system operated by means of notches on the edge of the film. This was developed by Disney engineers C. A. Hisserich and Tickner. Disney became an early customer for the newly established Hewlett-Packard company when it ordered eight of its Model 200B oscillators to test the Fantasound systems.

The following table summarizes the different Fantasound setups, panning methods and speaker placement described before:

Fantasound setup	Source channels	Surround panning method	Speaker count	Speaker layout
Mark I	2	Manual (one channel)	5	resize
Mark II	3	Manual (all channels)	8	resize
Mark III	3	Manual (one channel) + Automated (one channel)	8	resize
Mark IV	3	Automated (all channels)	8	resize
Mark V, VI, VII, VIII	3	Automated (all channels)	3	resize
Mark IX	3	Automated (all channels) + Manual sound redirection from F to B/S speakers)	7	resize
Mark X	3	Automated (all channels)	7	resize

== Fantasia roadshows with Fantasound, 1940–41 ==
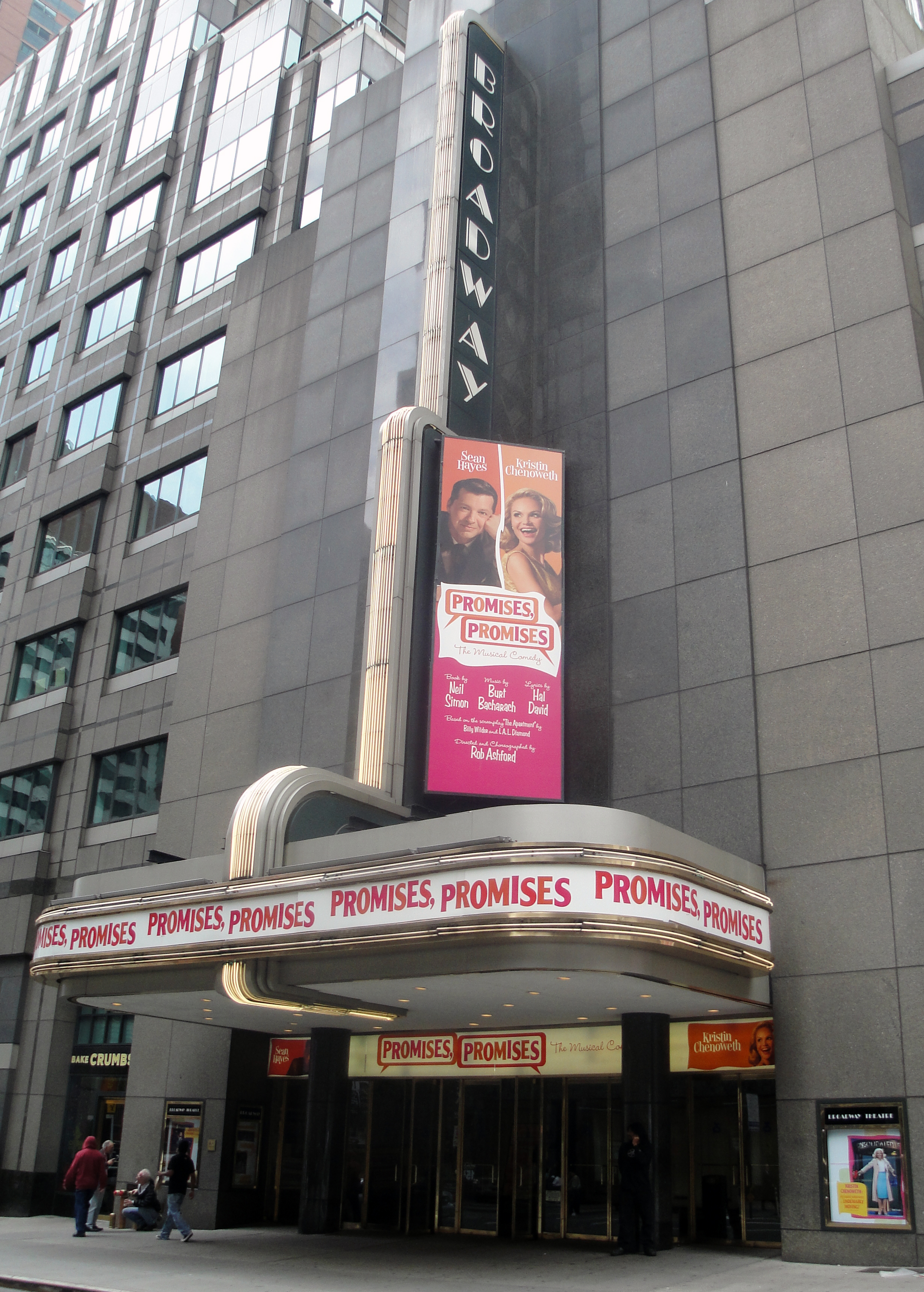
The Broadway Theatre in New York City.

Fantasia debuted as a roadshow theatrical release under Walt Disney Productions at The Broadway Theatre in New York City on November 13, 1940. The film was shown in only 13 theatres, as the installation of equipment required for Fantasound at each venue was costly. Twelve of the thirteen theaters were legitimate theaters converted for the purpose, not movie theaters, due to the need to close the theater during installation of Fantasound. With these expenses and its large budget, Fantasia was unable to make a profit during its initial release.

Fantasound never expanded beyond the initial roadshow engagements in New York, Los Angeles (where the automatic Mark X system was used), Boston, Philadelphia, Chicago, Detroit, San Francisco, Baltimore, Washington, Minneapolis, Buffalo, Pittsburgh and Cleveland. Eight of the roadshow engagements used the Mark IX systems.

== End of roadshows and development, 1941 ==
Garity and RCA's Watson Jones ended the roadshows in 1941, and later gave these reasons:

- The amount of equipment required and the time necessary to make the installation.
- Because of the time element, attractive theaters were not available to Disney, as the first-class houses in the various communities had established policies and the installation of the equipment would generally require keeping the theater "dark" for a few days.
- The advent of wartime conditions precluded the possibility of developing mobile units that would have lessened installation time and costs.
- The variation in the regulations throughout the country, both as to operating personnel and local ordinances, materially affected the operating and installation costs.
- Limited space in many projection rooms was a major problem.

In April 1941, RKO Radio Pictures acquired the distribution rights of Fantasia and replaced the Fantasound soundtrack with a mono soundtrack. The film got a wide release in 1942 as a double feature with Valley of the Sun with its duration cut to 80 minutes. All but one of the Fantasound systems were dismantled and contributed to the war effort.

On February 26, 1942, an Academy Honorary Award was given to Disney, Garity, Hawkins and RCA for their "outstanding contribution to the advancement of the use of sound in motion pictures through the production of Fantasia".

== Legacy ==
Fantasound marked the first use of the click track, overdubbing of orchestral parts, and simultaneous multi-track recording. Almost a fifth of the film's budget was spent on musical recording techniques.

Fantasia was re-released multiple times, with the full-length version making a return to theaters in 1946. Stereo sound was not restored until its 1956 release, when it was also presented in SuperScope, an anamorphic widescreen format similar to CinemaScope. To create the stereo soundtrack, the original tracks were transferred across telephone lines from the optical Fantasound equipment to the new magnetic recording equipment. These were housed in separate buildings and could not be brought together. This wire transfer resulted in some loss of treble response, but the copies retained the original dynamic range.

For Fantasia's 1982 issue, the original recordings were abandoned altogether and a completely new soundtrack was recorded using digital stereo technology in Dolby Stereo, conducted by Irwin Kostal, who later composed the score for Mickey's Christmas Carol (1983).

The original soundtrack returned when Fantasound was recorded by RCA and was also recreated in Dolby Stereo for the film's 1990 theatrical release. Disney audio engineer Terry Porter spent six months restoring the Stokowski soundtrack. He used remastering technology to remove some 3,000 pops from the four-track magnetic copy from 1955, with tools also used on phasing, hiss and distortion. "I proposed to management that we could piece the soundtrack together...in a way that re-created the impact of the original roadshow. When we play it back...it exactly simulates the way their equipment played in the theaters...back then." The result, named "Fantasound 90," was only set up in two theaters, one each in New York City and Los Angeles. The six-channel surround print that Porter created was also used as the basis for the master soundtrack of the film's DVD release on November 14, 2000.

The Stokowski and Kostal recordings of Fantasia's soundtrack are currently owned by Buena Vista Records.

For Walt Disney Pictures' 2016 film version of The Jungle Book, director Jon Favreau and composer John Debney sought to recreate the Fantasound experience Disney had in mind. When mixing the soundtrack in Dolby Atmos, as Favreau said, "we isolated instruments when we could. And in the sound mix, we created a Fantasound mix. If you see the film in Atmos, you will feel that there are instruments that move around the theater." A mention for Fantasound appears in the film's closing credits.

== Personnel ==
The following is a list of persons who were acknowledged by Garity and Hawkins in a 1941 article for their "suggestions and assistance in the development of Fantasound":

- C. O. Slyfield
- W. C. Lamb, Jr.
- Charles A. Hisserich
- H. M. Tremaine
- P. J. Holmes
- Melville Poche
- H. J. Steck
- E. A. Freitas
