= Surround channels =

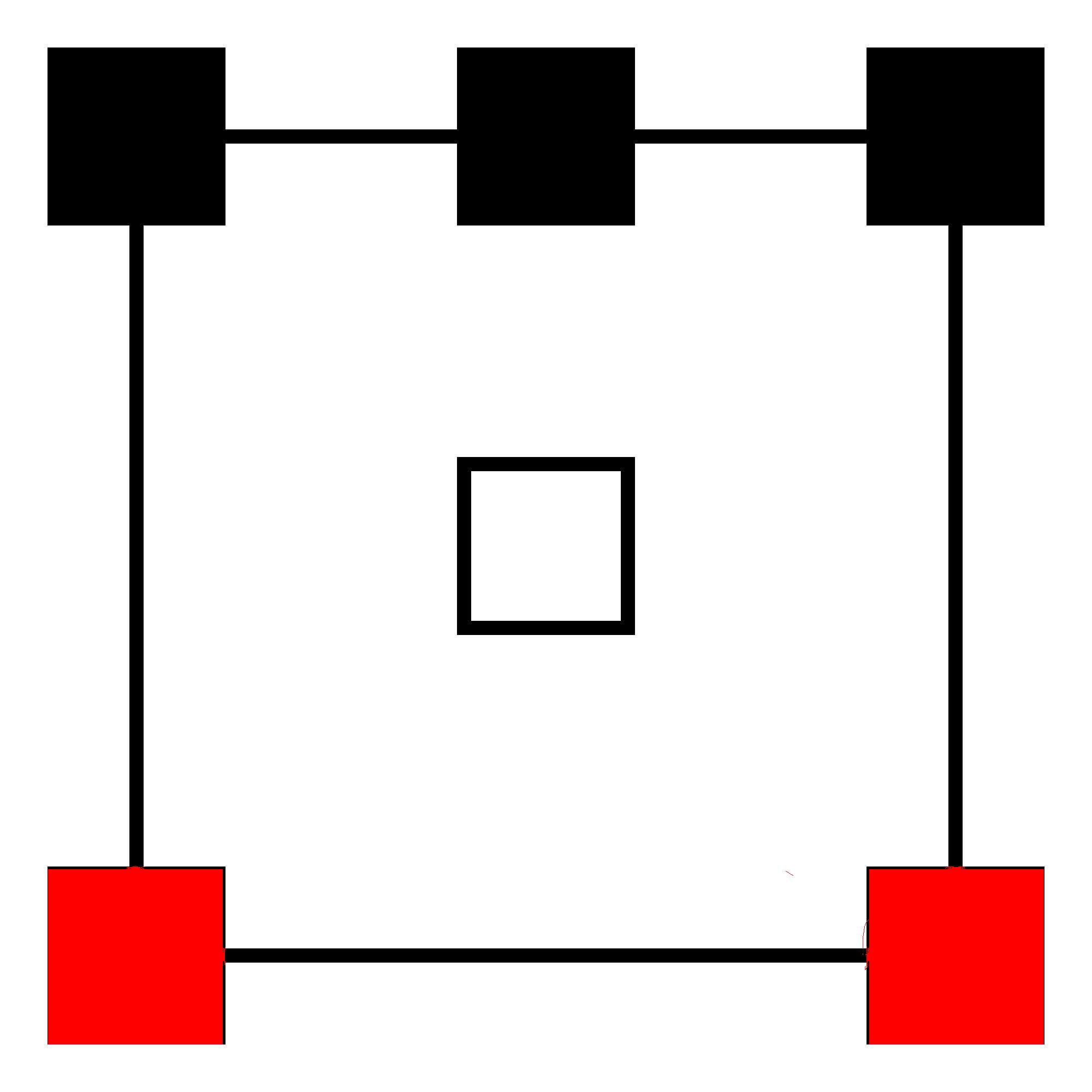
Surround channels in a 5.1 speaker setup in red

Surround channels in a Dolby Pro Logic 4.0 system using two speakers in antiphase or a dipole speaker

Single rear surround channel in a 6.1 system

Surround channels are audio channels in surround sound multichannel audio. They primarily serve to deliver ambience and diffuse sounds in a film or music soundtrack.

== History ==
Dolby Stereo (1975) was the first standard cinema sound system using a single matrixed mono rear channel (note Disney's Fantasound from the 1930s used a surround channel). Dolby Surround (1982) was the first home audio system to use a rear channel. It and its successor, Dolby Pro Logic (1987), used a single rear surround channel, but often using two speakers connected in anti-phase or a dipole radiator, as shown in the speaker configuration diagram to the right in gray.

== Implementation ==
Unlike most typical speaker placements, surround speakers are often intended to radiate such that the sound reflects off walls so that the sound arrives at the listening position indirectly as a reflection rather than a direct wave. Often dipole (sometimes even quadrupole) speakers are used to do this, especially in small or home theater applications where an array of surround speakers as in a movie theater is not practical or possible. A common misconception is that surround channels are "rear channels." However, when only two speakers are used, they are meant to be placed on the side walls at 90-110 degrees relative to the screen. Surround speakers are placed above the listeners ears and are not angled towards the listener. In cinema setups, many more than two surround speakers are often used, being placed along the side walls and along the back wall, creating a very diffused sound in the auditorium.

For music surround channel information is intended to be more direct as in a soundstage there would be direct noise from all around and not ambience as in a movie setting. For this reason surround speakers should not be set up to be strictly diffuse. Optimally there should be discrete surround channels for diffuse and direct effects. This is part of the design for Tomlinson Holman's 10.2 surround sound. For movies surround channel information is usually more diffuse ambient noise.

Some surround sound systems such as Dolby Digital EX and Pro Logic IIx incorporate a third (back surround) or even fourth surround channel (back left and back right). These channels are matrixed from the standard surround channels; they are not discrete.

=== Rear/back surround channels ===
Some matrix encoding surround sound systems use a single back center channel surround (Dolby Digital EX, Dolby Pro Logic IIx 6.1) or a back left and back right (Dolby Pro Logic IIx 7.1) speaker configuration. Often the standard surround channels are misconceived to be "rear channels" when they are in fact meant to be placed at 90-120 degrees.

=== Surround arrays ===
In commercial cinema, where there is a large area to cover, it would be impractical to use a single speaker for each surround channel. Theater auditoria are often lined with speakers all along the side and back walls. This is to increase the size of the listening area. JBL states that surround speakers should be spaced evenly along the side and back walls, starting at no closer than 1/3 of the room length from the screen (so the surrounds do not interfere with the front channels) and should be located at about 10–12 feet high and angled down to face the opposite wall-floor boundary.
