= Low-frequency effects =

Band-limited audio for 3–120 Hz range

The low-frequency effects (LFE) channel is a band-limited audio track that is used for reproducing deep and intense low-frequency sounds in the 3–120 Hz frequency range.

This track is normally sent to a subwoofer—a loudspeaker designed to reproduce very low frequencies. LFE channels originated in Dolby Stereo 70 mm film, but in the 1990s and 2000s they became common in home theater systems in order to reproduce film soundtracks found on DVDs and Blu-ray discs.

== Types ==
=== Low-pitched musical arts ===
LFEs include both low-pitched musical notes and low-pitched sound effects. The musical soundtrack for many films includes bass instruments that produce very low notes. Until the 1970s, most of the low-pitched instruments were natural, acoustic instruments, such as the double bass or the pipe organ's pedal keyboard. After the 1980s, film scores increasingly used synthesized instruments, including synth bass keyboards, which incorporated very low-pitched notes.

=== Sound effects ===
The most challenging sounds to reproduce from a sound engineering standpoint are usually the extremely low-pitched sound effects in the 20 Hz range, such as those used to simulate the sound of an explosion, earthquake, a rocket launch, or submarine depth charges. The human ear is not very sensitive to sounds at these low frequencies, so it takes a tremendous amount of amplification for the human ear to hear them. Further, sounds at these frequencies are more felt in the body, rather than heard. As well, since they are sound effects, they may have a longer duration or sustain than many low-pitched musical notes, which makes them harder to reproduce accurately.

It is a formidable challenge for an amplifier, subwoofer speakers, and cabinet to reproduce these sound effects at a high volume without encountering problems such as power amplifier clipping (distortion), unwanted rattle or resonance in the wooden cabinet, or excessive "chuffing" sounds from the bass reflex vent (if a vent or port is used in the cabinet). Sound recording magazines sometimes use the loud, rumbling sound effects simulating the sound of the submarine depth charges which were used in the World War II film U-571 (2000) to test the accuracy of subwoofer systems.

== Development ==
The LFE channel originated in Dolby Stereo 70 mm Six Track film prints, as a way of providing louder bass and sub-bass effects, without detracting from the quality of the standard audio channels. The LFE channel is conventionally played back 10 dB louder than the main channels, giving significantly more recording headroom. Also, the separate recording allowed a straightforward installation of extra dedicated subwoofers, and removed the need to upgrade the main speakers.

Later formats such as Dolby Digital retained the LFE channel, although this is more through convention and backwards compatibility than necessity, as digital formats have greater dynamic range than the magnetic analogue recordings on 70 mm prints, and modern sound processors have a bass management system to redirect bass from all channels to a subwoofer.

== Home theater systems ==
In the 1990s surround sound home theater systems became available to enhance the experience of viewing DVD and Blu-ray films. Prior to the advent of home theater systems, when VCRs were used, the enhanced sound option was stereo high-fidelity sound or Dolby Pro Logic for Dolby Surround-encoded tapes. With home theater systems, a multichannel audio system was used to deliver different sounds to six or more different speakers. The widely used 5.1-channel audio system consists of five full-range main (Left, Center, Right, Left rear Surround, and Right rear Surround) plus a Low-Frequency Effects (LFE) channel. Many typical home theater systems, especially home theater in a box systems, are incapable of accurately reproducing LFE in the 20 Hz range.

The LFE channel delivers bass-only information to supplement the overall bass content. The LFE channel content is not the same as the content of a subwoofer-out jack. The LFE channel is used to carry additional bass information in the surround sound programming, while the subwoofer output is bass information from up to all six channels that has been selected to be reproduced by the subwoofer via a bass management system.

The bass management in surround sound replay systems is that bass content in the incoming signal, irrespective of channel, should be directed only to loudspeakers capable of handling it. The bass management system may direct bass to one or more subwoofers (if present) from any channel, not simply the content of the LFE channel.

== Bass Shaker ==
The LFE channel can be output to one or more tactile transducers, also known as "bass shakers". When connected to the subwoofer output, the bass shaker will vibrate at the frequency of the bass, usually between 20 and 200 Hz, without producing much audible sound. Tactile transducers are frequently mounted directly to the frame of a chair or sofa. A listener's body can feel the vibrations from the LFE, enhancing the overall sensation of the bass.

== See also ==
- Bass management
- Surround sound
