= Dolby Digital =

Audio compression technologies

Logo from 2012–2021; introduced in 2007.

Dolby Digital, originally synonymous with Dolby AC-3 (see below), is the name for a family of audio compression technologies developed by Dolby Laboratories. Called Dolby Stereo Digital until 1995, it uses lossy compression (except for Dolby TrueHD). The first use of Dolby Digital was to provide digital sound in cinemas from 35 mm film prints. It has since also been used for TV broadcast, radio broadcast via satellite, digital video streaming, DVDs, Blu-ray discs and game consoles.

Dolby AC-3 was the original version of the Dolby Digital codec. The basis of the Dolby AC-3 multi-channel audio coding standard is the modified discrete cosine transform (MDCT), a lossy audio compression algorithm. It is a modification of the discrete cosine transform (DCT) algorithm, which was proposed by Nasir Ahmed in 1972 for image compression. The DCT was adapted into the MDCT by J.P. Princen, A.W. Johnson and Alan B. Bradley at the University of Surrey in 1987.

Dolby Laboratories adapted the MDCT algorithm along with perceptual coding principles to develop the AC-3 audio format for cinema. The AC-3 format was released as the Dolby Digital standard in February 1991. Dolby Digital was the earliest MDCT-based audio compression standard released, and was followed by others for home and portable usage, such as Sony's ATRAC (1992), the MP3 standard (1993), and AAC (1997).

== Cinema ==
Batman Returns was the first film to be announced as using Dolby SR-D (Spectral Recording-Digital) technology when it premiered in all selected theaters in the summer of 1992. Dolby Digital cinema soundtracks are optically recorded on a 35 mm release print using sequential data blocks placed between every perforation hole on the soundtrack side of the film. A constant bit rate of 320 kbit/s is used. A charge-coupled device (CCD) scanner in the image projector picks up a scanned video image of this area, and a processor correlates the image area and extracts the digital data as an AC-3 bitstream. The data is then decoded into a 5.1 channel audio source. All film prints with Dolby Digital data also have Dolby Stereo analog soundtracks using Dolby SR noise reduction, and such prints are known as Dolby SR-D prints. The analog soundtrack provides a fall-back option in case of damage to the data area or failure of the digital decoding; it also provides compatibility with projectors not equipped with digital soundheads. Almost all modern cinema prints are of this type, and may also include SDDS data and a timecode track to synchronize CD-ROMs carrying DTS soundtracks.

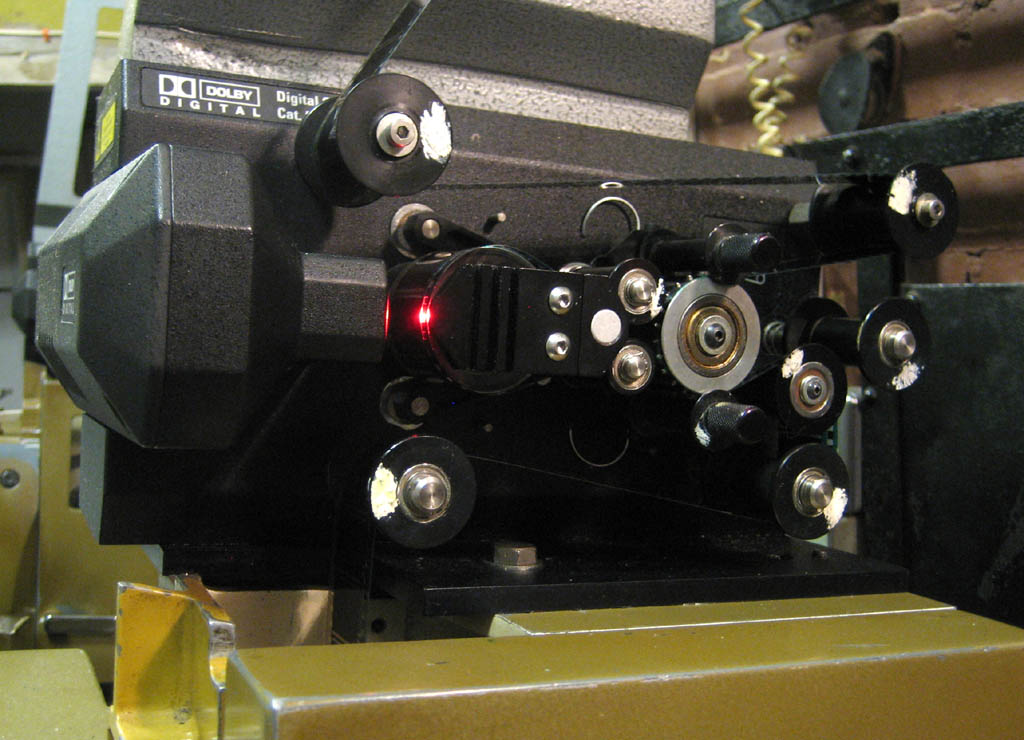
A Dolby Digital Penthouse Soundhead mounted on a mid-1950s vintage Kalee model 20 projector

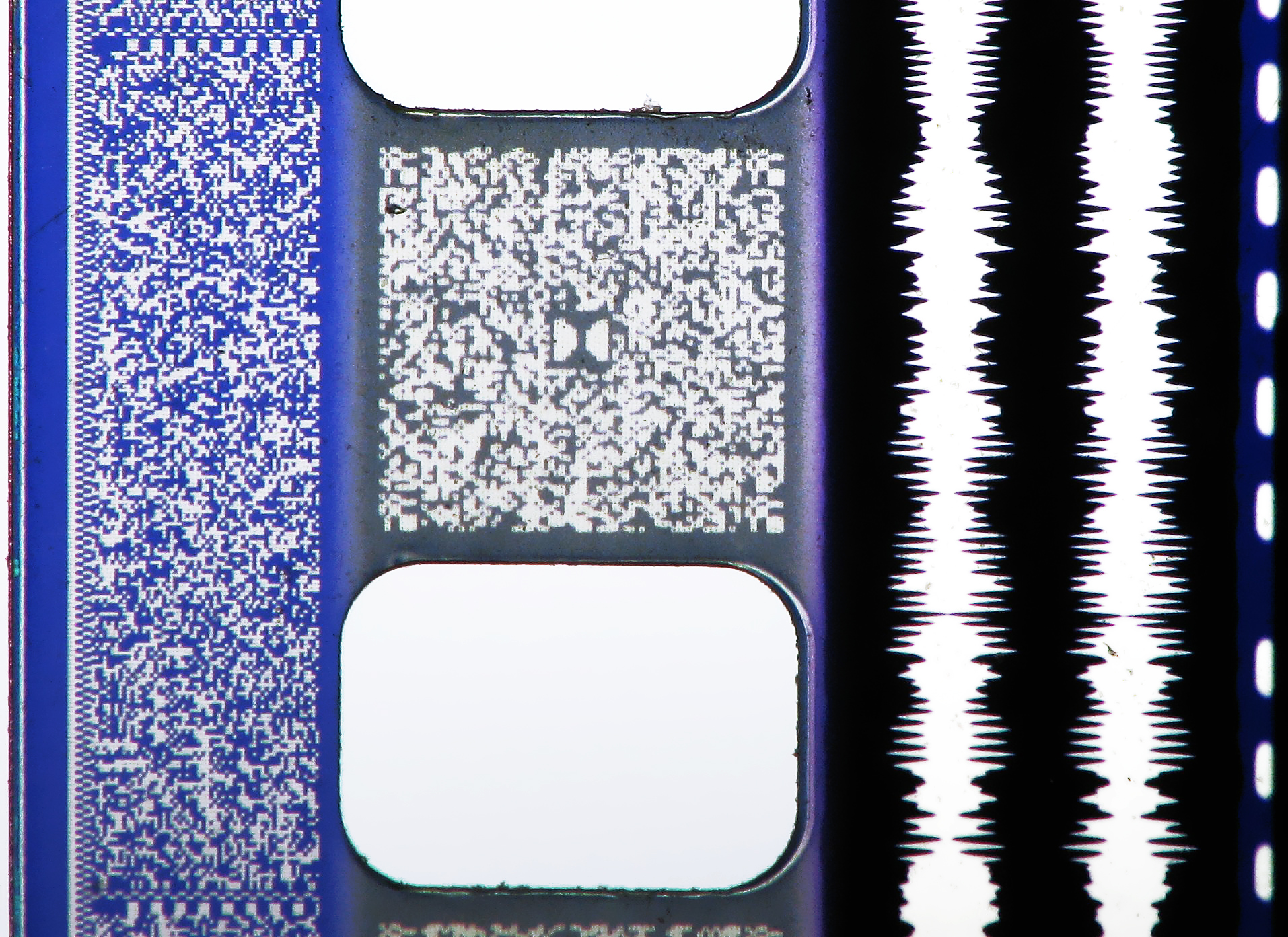
A photo of a 35 mm film print featuring all four audio formats (or quad track) - from left to right: Sony Dynamic Digital Sound (SDDS) (blue area to the left of the sprocket holes), Dolby Digital (grey area between the sprocket holes labelled with the Dolby Double-D logo in the middle), analog optical sound (the two white lines to the right of the sprocket holes), and the DTS time code (the dashed line to the far right)

The simplest way of converting existing projectors is to add a so-called penthouse digital soundhead above the projector head. However, for new projectors it made sense to use dual analog/digital soundheads in the normal optical soundhead position under the projector head. To allow for the dual-soundhead arrangement the data is recorded 26 frames ahead of the picture. If a penthouse soundhead is used, the data must be delayed in the processor for the required amount of time, around 2 seconds. This delay can be adjusted in steps of the time between perforations, (approximately 10.4 ms).

Dolby Atmos, originally designed for the motion picture industry, was introduced in April 2012. For home entertainment, Dolby Atmos can be delivered using several audio codecs, including Dolby Digital Plus, Dolby AC-4, Dolby MAT and Dolby TrueHD.

== Versions ==
Dolby Digital has similar technologies, included in Dolby Digital EX, Dolby Digital Live, Dolby Digital Plus, Dolby Digital Surround EX, Dolby Digital Recording, Dolby Digital Cinema, Dolby Digital Stereo Creator and Dolby Digital 5.1 Creator.

=== Dolby AC-3 ===
Dolby AC-3
- Filename extension: .ac3
- Internet media type: audio/ac3
- Uniform Type Identifier (UTI): public.ac3-audio

The former Dolby Digital logo, entitled "Aurora", that was sometimes shown at the start of broadcasts, feature films, and video games

The old Dolby Digital logo

Dolby AC-3 (a backronym for Audio Codec 3, Advanced Codec 3, or Acoustic Coder 3), also known as ATSC A/52 (name of the standard) or simply Dolby Digital (DD), is the common version containing up to six discrete channels of sound. Prior to 1996, it was marketed as Dolby Surround AC-3, Dolby Stereo Digital, and Dolby SRD.

The most elaborate mode of this codec in common use involves five channels for normal-range speakers (20 Hz – 20,000 Hz) (right, center, left, right surround, left surround) and one channel (20 Hz – 120 Hz allotted audio) for the subwoofer driven low-frequency effects. Mono and stereo modes are also supported. AC-3 supports audio sample rates up to 48 kHz.

In 1991, a limited experimental release of Star Trek VI: The Undiscovered Country in Dolby Digital played in three US theatres. In 1992, Batman Returns was the first film to be released and presented in Dolby Digital. In 1995, Whisper of the Heart was the first Japanese film to be presented in Dolby Digital. In 1995, the LaserDisc version of Clear and Present Danger featured the first home theater Dolby Digital mix, quickly followed by True Lies, Stargate, Forrest Gump and Interview with the Vampire, among others.

=== Dolby Digital Surround EX ===
Dolby Digital Surround EX (sometimes shortened to Dolby Digital EX) is similar to Dolby's earlier Pro Logic format, which utilized matrix technology to add a center surround channel and single rear surround channel to stereo soundtracks. EX adds an extension to the standard 5.1 channel Dolby Digital codec in the form of matrixed rear channels, creating 6.1 or 7.1 channel output.

It provides an economical and backwards-compatible means for 5.1 soundtracks to carry a sixth, center-back surround channel for improved localization of effects. The extra surround channel is matrix encoded onto the discrete left surround and right surround channels of the 5.1 mix, much like the front center channel on Dolby Pro Logic encoded stereo soundtracks. The result can be played without loss of information on standard 5.1 systems or played in 6.1 or 7.1 on systems with Surround EX decoding and added speakers. A number of DVDs have a Dolby Digital Surround EX audio option.

The theater version of Dolby Digital Surround EX was introduced in 1999, when Dolby collaborated with THX, a division of Lucasfilm, to create the system for the release of Star Wars: Episode I – The Phantom Menace. Dolby Digital Surround EX has since been used on the DVD releases of the Star Wars prequel and original trilogies.

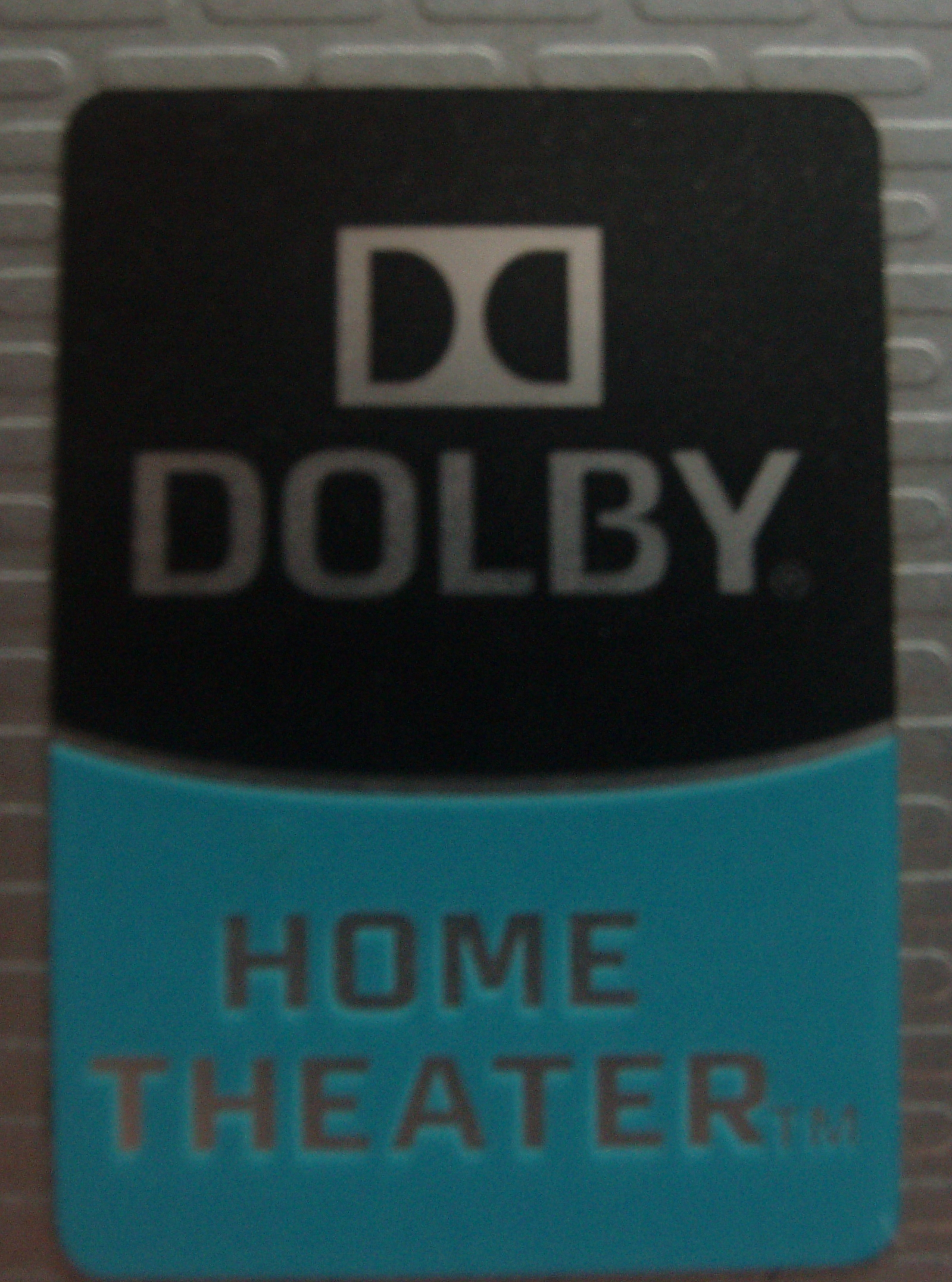
A Dolby home theater badge on a laptop computer

=== Dolby Digital Live ===
Dolby Digital Live (DDL) is a real-time encoding technology for interactive media such as video games. It converts any audio signals on a PC or game console into a 5.1-channel 16-bit/48 kHz Dolby Digital format at 640 kbit/s and transports it via a single S/PDIF cable. A similar technology known as DTS Connect is available from competitor DTS. An important benefit of this technology is that it enables the use of digital multichannel sound with consumer sound cards, which are otherwise limited to digital PCM stereo or analog multichannel sound because S/PDIF over RCA, BNC, and TOSLINK can only support two-channel PCM, Dolby Digital multichannel audio, and DTS multichannel audio. HDMI was later introduced, and it can carry uncompressed multichannel PCM, lossless compressed multichannel audio, and lossy compressed digital audio. However, Dolby Digital Live is still useful with HDMI to allow transport of multichannel audio over HDMI to devices that are unable to handle uncompressed multichannel PCM.

Dolby Digital Live is available in sound cards using various manufacturers' audio chipsets. The SoundStorm, used for the Xbox game console and certain nForce2 motherboards, used an early form of this technology. DDL is available on motherboards with codecs such as Realtek's ALC882D, ALC888DD and ALC888H. Other examples include some C-Media PCI sound cards and Creative Labs' X-Fi and Z series sound cards, whose drivers have enabled support for DDL.

Nvidia later decided to drop DDL support in their motherboards due to the cost of involved royalties, leaving an empty space in this regard in the sound cards market. In June 2005, Auzentech introduced its X-Mystique PCI card, the first consumer sound card with Dolby Digital Live support.

Initially, no Creative X-Fi-based sound cards supported DDL (between 2005 and 2007), but a collaboration between Creative and Auzentech resulted in the development of the Auzentech Prelude, the first X-Fi card to support DDL. Originally planned to extend DDL support to all X-Fi-based sound cards (except the "Xtreme Audio" line, which is incapable of DDL hardware implementation), the plan was dropped because Dolby licensing would have required a royalty payment for all X-Fi cards and, problematically, those already sold. In 2008, Creative released the X-Fi Titanium series of sound cards, which fully supports Dolby Digital Live while leaving all PCI versions of Creative X-Fi still lacking support for DDL. Since September 2008, all Creative X-Fi-based sound cards support DDL (except the "Xtreme Audio" and its derivatives such as Prodigy 7.1e, which is incapable of DDL in hardware); X-Fi's case differs.

While they forgot about the plan, programmer Daniel Kawakami made a hot issue by applying Auzentech Prelude DDL module back to Creative X-Fi cards by disguising the hardware identity as Auzentech Prelude. Creative Labs alleged Kawakami violated their intellectual property and demanded he cease distributing his modified drivers.

Creative eventually struck an agreement with Dolby Laboratories regarding the Dolby license royalty by arranging that the licensing cost be folded into the purchase price of the Creative X-Fi PCI cards rather than as a royalty paid by Creative themselves. Based on the agreement, in September 2008, Creative began selling the Dolby Digital Live packs enabling DDL on Creative's X-Fi PCI series of sound cards. Subsequently, Creative added their DTS Connect pack to the DDL pack at no added cost.

=== Dolby Digital Plus ===
Dolby E-AC-3
- Internet media type: audio/eac3
- Uniform Type Identifier (UTI): public.enhanced-ac3-audio

E-AC-3 (Dolby Digital Plus) is an enhanced coding system based on the AC-3 codec. It offers increased bit rates (up to 6.144 Mbit/s), support for even more audio channels (up to 15.1 discrete channels in the future), and improved coding techniques (only at low data rates) to reduce compression artifacts, enabling lower data rates than those supported by AC-3 (e.g. 5.1-channel audio at 256 kbit/s). It is not backward compatible with existing AC-3 hardware, though E-AC-3 codecs generally are capable of transcoding to AC-3 for equipment connected via S/PDIF. E-AC-3 decoders can also decode AC-3 bitstreams. The fourth generation Apple TV supports E-AC-3. The discontinued HD DVD system directly supported E-AC-3. Blu-ray Disc offers E-AC-3 as an option to graft added channels onto an otherwise 5.1 AC-3 stream, as well as for delivery of secondary audio content (e.g. director's commentary) that is intended to be mixed with the primary audio soundtrack in the Blu-ray Disc player.

=== Dolby AC-4 ===
Dolby AC-4 is an audio compression standard supporting multiple audio channels and/or audio objects. Support for 5.1 channel audio is mandatory while additional channels up to 7.1.4 are optional. AC-4 provides a 50% reduction in bit rate over AC-3/Dolby Digital Plus.

=== Dolby TrueHD ===
Dolby TrueHD is an advanced lossless audio codec based on Meridian Lossless Packing. Support for the codec was mandatory for HD DVD and is optional for Blu-ray Disc hardware. Dolby TrueHD supports 24-bit bit depths and sample rates up to 192 kHz. Maximum bit rate is 18 Mbit/s while it supports up to 16 audio channels (HD DVD and Blu-ray Disc standards currently limit the maximum number of audio channels to eight). It supports metadata, including dialog normalization and Dynamic Range Control.

== Channel configurations ==
Although commonly associated with the 5.1 channel configuration, Dolby Digital allows a number of different channel selections. The options are:

- Dolby Digital 1/0 – Mono (center only)
- Dolby Digital 2/0 – 2-channel stereo (left + right), optionally carrying matrixed Dolby Surround
- Dolby Digital 3/0 – 3-channel stereo (left, center, right)
- Dolby Digital 2/1 – 2-channel stereo with mono surround (left, right, surround)
- Dolby Digital 3/1 – 3-channel stereo with mono surround (left, center, right, surround)
- Dolby Digital 2/2 – 4-channel quadraphonic (left, right, left surround, right surround)
- Dolby Digital 3/2 – 5-channel surround (left, center, right, left surround, right surround)

These configurations optionally include the extra low-frequency effects (LFE) channel, but only if at least three channels are present. The last two with stereo surrounds can optionally use Dolby Digital EX matrix encoding to add an extra Rear Surround channel, indicated via a 2-bit flag.

Many Dolby Digital decoders are equipped with downmixing to distribute encoded channels to speakers. This includes such functions as playing surround information through the front speakers if surround speakers are unavailable and distributing the center channel to left and right if no center speaker is available. When outputting to separate equipment over a 2-channel connection, a Dolby Digital decoder can optionally encode the output using Dolby Surround to preserve surround information.

The ".1" in 5.1, 7.1, etc. refers to the LFE channel, which is also a discrete channel.

== Applications ==
Dolby Digital audio is used on DVD and other purely digital media such as home cinema. In this format, the AC-3 bitstream is interleaved with the video and control bitstreams.

The system is used in bandwidth-limited applications other than DVD, such as digital TV. The AC-3 standard allows a maximum coded bit rate of 640 kbit/s. 35 mm film prints use a fixed rate of 320 kbit/s, which is the same as the maximum bit rate for 2-channel MP3. DVDs are limited to 448 kbit/s, although many players can successfully play higher-rate bitstreams (which are non-compliant with the DVD specification). HD DVD limits AC-3 to 448 kbit/s, as do ATSC and digital cable standards. Blu-ray Disc, the PlayStation 3, and the Xbox game console can output an AC-3 signal at a full 640 kbit/s. Some PlayStation 2 games are able to output AC-3 standard audio as well, primarily during pre-rendered cutscenes.

Dolby is part of a group of organizations involved in the development of AAC (Advanced Audio Coding), part of MPEG specifications, and considered the successor to MP3.

Dolby Digital Plus (DD-Plus) and TrueHD are supported in HD DVD, as mandatory codecs, and in Blu-ray Disc, as optional codecs.

== Dolby technologies in packaged media formats ==
	Blu-ray Disc			DVD-Audio			DVD-Video			HD DVD			LaserDisc		
Codec	Player support	Channels (max)	Max bit rate	Player support	Channels (max)	Max bit rate	Player support	Channels (max)	Max bit rate	Player support	Channels (max)	Max bit rate	Player support	Channels (max)	Max bit rate
Dolby Digital	Mandatory	5.1	640 kbit/s	Optional	5.1	448 kbit/s	Mandatory	5.1	448 kbit/s	Mandatory	5.1	448 kbit/s	Optional	5.1	384 kbit/s
Dolby Digital Plus	Optional	7.1	1.7 Mbit/s	Unsupported			Unsupported			Mandatory	7.1	3 Mbit/s	Unsupported		
Dolby TrueHD	Optional	7.1	18 Mbit/s	Unsupported			Unsupported			Mandatory	7.1	18 Mbit/s	Unsupported		

== AC3RF ==
In the LaserDisc world, AC3RF is the term widely placed on connectors of players that support Dolby Digital. Specific demodulators and receivers from the LaserDisc era (from the 1990s to the early 2000s) also include placement of this term on connectors. LaserDisc titles with Dolby Digital tracks often have the THX logo on their covers.

== Technical details ==
The data layout of AC-3 is described by simplified "C-like" language in official specifications. An AC-3 stream is a series of frames; the frame size code is used along with the sample rate code to determine the number of (2-byte) words before the next syncword. Channel blocks can be either long, in which case the entire block is processed as single modified discrete cosine transform, or short, in which case two half-length transforms are performed on the block. Below is a simplified AC-3 header. A detailed description is in the ATSC "Digital Audio Compression (AC-3) (E-AC-3) Standard", section 5.4.

Field Name	# of bits	Description
Syncword	16	0x0B77, data transmission is left bit first: big endian
Cyclic redundancy check	16	
Sampling frequency	2	'11'=reserved '10'=32 kHz '01'=44.1 '00'=48
Frame size code	6	
Bit stream identification	5	
Bit stream mode	3	'000'=main audio service
Audio coding mode	3	'010'=left, right channel ordering
Center mix level	2	
Surround mix level	2	
Dolby Surround mode	2	'00'=not indicated '01'= Not surround encoded '10'= Yes, surround encoded

== License ==
AC3 was covered by patents that expired in March 2017. Developers were asked to pay a commercial license in order to legally publish an application that decodes AC3. This led some audio app developers to ban AC3 from their apps, although the open source VLC media player supported AC-3 audio without having paid a patent license fee.

In Dolby's 2005 original and amended S-1 filings with the SEC, Dolby acknowledged that "Patents relating to our Dolby Digital technologies expire between 2008 and 2017."

The last patent covering AC-3 expired on March 20, 2017, rendering it free to use.

=== Open source implementation ===
A free ATSC A/52 (AC3) stream decoder, liba52, is available under the GNU General Public License. FFmpeg and the VLC media player each include code for handling AC-3.

== See also ==
- C-Media – producer of DDL audio chipsets used in many sound cards and motherboards
- Dialnorm – Dolby Digital metadata parameter controlling decoder gain
- Dolby Laboratories – company history and technology development
- Dolby noise-reduction system – analogue recording on magnetic tape, including compact cassette tapes
- Dolby Stereo – first active matrix analog surround sound format
- Dolby SR – Recording process, noise reduction and expander with superior fidelity over earlier A-type system
- Dolby Surround – Marketed consumer name of the theatrical Dolby Stereo analog surround format
- Dolby Pro Logic – Reference active 2:4 matrix decoding system used on Dolby Stereo soundtracks and Dolby Surround [after 1987]
- Dolby TrueHD – lossless codec for HD DVD and Blu-ray Disc
- Dolby E – allows 6 to 8 channels of audio to be compressed into an AES3 digital audio stream
- DTS, Inc. – formerly Digital Theater Systems
- Home cinema
- Loudspeaker
- SoundStorm – a real-time AC-3 encoder included in certain nForce2 motherboards
- THX
