= Dolby Pro Logic =

Surround sound processing technology developed by Dolby Labs

Dolby Surround/Dolby Pro Logic/Dolby Pro Logic II
- Product type: Surround sound
- Current owner: Dolby Laboratories
- Country: United States
- Introduced: 1982
- Related brands: Dolby Surround; Dolby Pro Logic; Dolby Pro Logic II; Dolby Pro Logic IIx; Dolby Pro Logic IIz; Dolby Surround; Dolby Digital; Dolby Stereo; LtRt
- Markets: Worldwide
- Website: Dolby official website

Dolby Pro Logic is a surround sound processing technology developed by Dolby Laboratories, designed to decode soundtracks encoded with Dolby Surround. The terms Dolby Stereo and LtRt (Left Total, Right Total) are also used to describe soundtracks that are encoded using this technique.

Dolby Stereo—also known as Dolby MP (Motion Picture) or Dolby SVA (stereo variable-area)—was developed by Dolby in 1976 for analog cinema sound systems. The format was adapted for home use in 1982 as Dolby Surround when HiFi capable consumer VCRs were introduced. It was further improved with the Dolby Pro Logic decoding system after 1987.

The Dolby MP Matrix was the professional system that encoded four channels of film sound into two. This track used by the Dolby Stereo theater system on a 35mm optical stereo print and decoded back to the original 4.0 Surround. The same four-channel encoded stereo track was largely left unchanged and made available to consumers as "Dolby Surround" on home video. However, the original Dolby Surround decoders in 1982 were a simple passive matrix three-channel decoder: L/R and mono Surround. The surround channel was limited to 7 kHz. It also had Dolby Noise Reduction and an adjustable delay, for improved channel separation and to prevent dialog leaking and arriving to listeners' ears first. The front center channel was equally split between the left and right channels for phantom center reproduction. This differed from the Cinema Dolby Stereo system which used active steering and other processing to decode a center channel for dialog and center focused on-screen action.

Later on in 1987, the Pro Logic decoding system was released to consumers. It featured virtually the same type of four-channel decoding as the Dolby Stereo theater processor with active steering logic and much better channel separation (up to 30 dB) as well as including a dedicated center channel output for the first time. Many standalone Pro Logic decoders also included a phantom center option for compatibility with earlier non-Pro Logic Dolby Surround equipped home theaters to split the center channel signal to the L/R speakers for legacy phantom center reproduction.

Dolby Surround Pro Logic is the full name that refers to the matrix surround format and decoding system in one. When a Dolby Surround soundtrack is created in post-production (Dolby MP Matrix), four channels of sound are matrix-encoded into an ordinary stereo (two-channel) soundtrack. The center channel is reduced in level by 3 dB and summed to the left and right channels; the surround channel is attenuated by 3 dB, passes through a band-pass filter (cutting frequencies under 100 Hz and above 7 kHz), passes through Dolby B noise reduction and is encoded on the left and right channels with opposite polarity (this is achieved by applying a +90-degree phase shift to the left channel and a −90-degree phase shift to the right channel). The surround channel was often used for ambient background sounds in the original recording, music scores and effects.

A Dolby Pro Logic decoder/processor "unfolds" the soundtrack back into its original 4.0 surround—left and right, center, and a single limited frequency-range (7 kHz low-pass filtered) mono rear channel—while systems lacking the decoder play back the audio as standard stereo.

Although Dolby Surround was introduced as an analog format, all Dolby Digital decoders incorporate a digitally implemented Dolby Surround Pro Logic decoder for digital stereo signals that carry matrix-encoded Dolby Surround. One of the first was the MSP400 surround sound receiver and amplifier by RCA for their high-end Dimensia brand. It was released in 1987 for the Digital Command Component System.

== Dolby Surround ==
Dolby Surround
- Product type: Surround sound
- Current owner: Dolby Laboratories
- Country: United States
- Introduced: 1982
- Related brands: Dolby Digital; Dolby Stereo
- Markets: Worldwide
- Website: Dolby official website

Dolby Surround is the earliest consumer version of Dolby's surround sound decoding technology. It was introduced to the public in 1982 during the time home video recording formats (such as Betamax and VHS) were introducing Stereo and HiFi capability. The name Dolby Surround described the consumer passive matrix decoding technology; the professional, active-matrix cinema technology bore the name Dolby Stereo. It was capable of decoding Dolby Stereo four-channel soundtracks to three output channels (Left, Right, Surround). The Center channel was fed equally to the Left and Right speakers. The Surround channel was limited to a 100 Hz to 7 kHz frequency bandwidth, as dialog from the center channel could leak into the surround channel—there was as little as 3 dB of separation between LCR and Surround channels.

== Dolby Pro Logic ==
Dolby Pro Logic
- Product type: Surround sound
- Current owner: Dolby Laboratories
- Country: United States
- Introduced: 1987
- Related brands: Dolby Digital; Dolby Stereo
- Markets: Worldwide
- Website: Dolby official website

In 1987 the decoding technology was updated and renamed Dolby Pro Logic.

A Pro Logic decoder/processor "unfolds" the sound into the original 4.0 surround—left and right, center, and a single limited frequency-range (7 kHz low-pass filtered) mono rear channel.

A Pro Logic decoder also uses 'Steering Logic', which drives amplifiers to raise or lower the output volume of each channel based on the current dominant sound direction. For example, while a mono signal is played, the strong correlation to the center channel triggers the output volume of the left, right and surround channels to be lowered. This increases the channel separation achievable to around 30 decibels between channels. By careful tuning of the response of the amplifiers, the total amount of signal energy remains constant and is unaffected by the operation of the channel steering. Additionally, the response time of the system to changes in sound direction is important as too fast a response results in a twitchy feel, while too slow a response leaves sounds coming from an inappropriate direction.

In addition to 5 dB of noise reduction, the surround channel is slightly delayed, so that any front channel sounds that leak into the surround channel arrive at the listener after the front channels. This takes advantage of the Haas effect—audio that is present in the front speakers but delayed in the surround speakers will have the psychoacoustic effect of emanating from the front of the sound stage.

Dolby Surround and Dolby Pro Logic decoders are similar in principle, as both use matrix technology to extract extra channels from Dolby Stereo stereo-encoded audio. The terms Dolby Stereo, Dolby Surround and Lt/Rt are all used to describe soundtracks that are matrix-encoded using this technique.

== Dolby Pro Logic II ==
Dolby Pro Logic II
- Product type: Surround sound
- Current owner: Dolby Laboratories
- Country: United States
- Introduced: 2000
- Related brands: Dolby Digital; Dolby Stereo
- Markets: Worldwide
- Website: Dolby official website

Older logo, before Dolby updated their overall logo design

In 2000, Dolby introduced Dolby Pro Logic II (DPL II), an improved implementation of Dolby Pro Logic created by Jim Fosgate. DPL II upmixes any high-quality stereo signal source into five separate full frequency channels (right front, center, left front, right rear and left rear), while also decoding five channels from stereo signals encoded in traditional four-channel Dolby Surround. DPL II implements greatly enhanced steering compared to DPL, and as a result, offers an exceptionally stable sound field that simulates five-channel surround sound.

Because of the limited nature of the original Dolby Pro Logic encoding, many consumer electronics manufacturers introduced their own processing circuitry, such as the "Jazz", "Hall", and "Stadium" modes found on most common home audio receivers. DPL II forgoes this type of processing and replaces it with simple servo (negative feedback) circuits used to derive five channels. The extra channel content is extracted using the difference between the spatial audio content between two individual channels of stereo tracks or Dolby Digital encoded 5.1 channel tracks and outputs it appropriately.

In addition to five full-range playback channels, Pro Logic II introduced a Music mode that includes optimized channel delays and adds user controls to—for example—adjust apparent sound stage width.

Pro Logic II systems also have a mode designed specifically for video games which is used in games for PlayStation 2, GameCube, and Wii as an alternative to digital surround formats such as Dolby Digital or DTS. Game mode is similar to Movie mode, except it redirects more bass to the LFE channel.

== Dolby Pro Logic IIx ==
Dolby Pro Logic IIx
- Product type: Surround sound
- Current owner: Dolby Laboratories
- Country: United States
- Introduced: 2003
- Related brands: Dolby Digital; Dolby Stereo
- Markets: Worldwide
- Website: Dolby official website

The Dolby Pro Logic IIx system, available since 2003, can take two-channel stereo, Dolby Surround (sometimes called Dolby Stereo Surround) and Dolby Digital 5.1 source material and up-convert it to 6.1 or 7.1 channel surround sound.

== Dolby Pro Logic IIz ==
Dolby Pro Logic IIz
- Product type: Surround sound
- Current owner: Dolby Laboratories
- Country: United States
- Introduced: 2009
- Related brands: Dolby Digital; Dolby Stereo
- Markets: Worldwide
- Website: Dolby official website

Dolby Pro Logic IIz expands on Pro Logic IIx with the addition of a height component, creating front height channels above the front left and right speakers, expanding a 5.1 or 7.1 system to 7.1 Height or 9.1. It identifies spatial cues in low-level, uncorrelated information, such as ambience and effects like rain or wind in the side and rear surround channels, and directs it to the front height speakers. The channels it adds are matrixed, not discrete.

== Dolby Surround (2014) ==
Dolby Surround
- Product type: Surround sound
- Current owner: Dolby Laboratories
- Country: United States
- Introduced: 2014
- Related brands: Dolby Digital; Dolby Stereo; Dolby Atmos
- Markets: Worldwide
- Website: Dolby official website

Dolby reintroduced the Dolby Surround terminology in 2014. The term now refers to a new upmixer whose purpose is to enable Dolby Atmos receivers and speaker configurations to serve non-Atmos signals; it's sometimes called Virtual Dolby Atmos.

Dolby Surround is a complete replacement for Dolby Pro Logic that upmixes stereo and multi-channel inputs to play over Atmos configurations. Compared to Dolby Pro Logic, Dolby Surround updated the algorithm for modern audio and video contents.

== Software encoding and decoding ==
- The liba52 decoder library for AC3 and A52 digital sound optionally exports Lt/Rt stereo sound compatible with Pro Logic decoders.
- HandBrake and FFmpeg are capable of downmixing Dolby Digital AC-3 5.1 to Lt/Rt stereo tracks compatible with Dolby Pro Logic I & II decoders.
- SurCode for Dolby Pro Logic II is a Dolby-certified software encoder and decoder available in plug-in formats for DAWs and as a standalone application.

== Hardware encoding ==
- Dolby Digital (AC3) compatible hardware (DVDs, TVs, Blu-ray players) downmixes the 5.1 channel tracks into Lt/Rt stereo compatible with Pro Logic decoders

== See also ==
- Dolby encoding and decoding matrices
- Dolby Digital
- Dolby Atmos
- DTS Neo:6
- AV receiver
- Surround sound
