= Optonica =

Hi-Fi subbrand of Sharp

Optonica was a subdivision of Japanese electronics manufacturer Sharp that made high-end hi-fi products and systems.

== History ==
=== 1975 ===
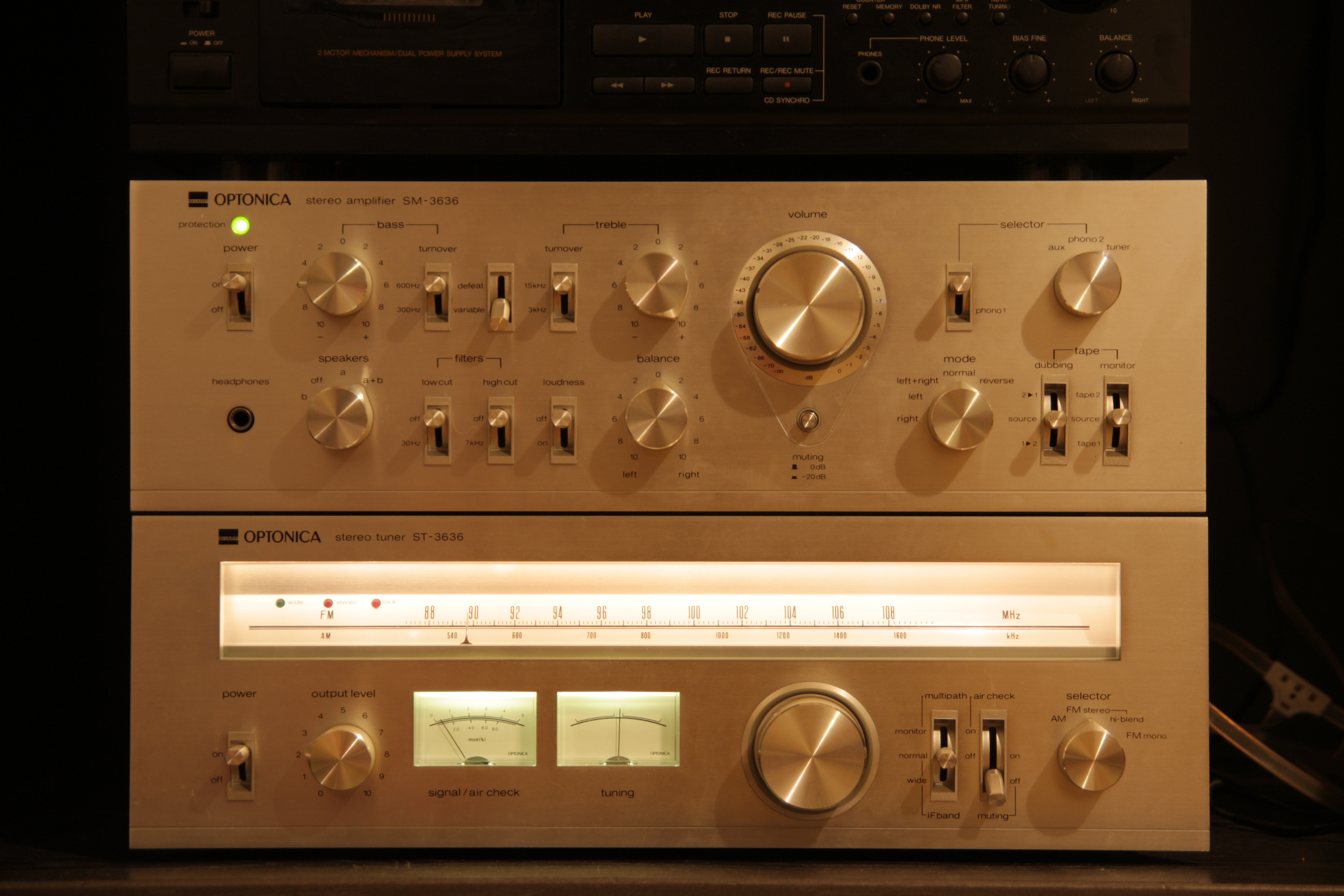
Optonica amplifier (SM-3636) and tuner (ST-3636) from 1978.

The Optonica brand was created and first launched by Sharp of Japan in 1975 to compete in the high-end audio market along with established brands such as Sansui Electric, Sony, Panasonic, Sanyo, Yamaha, Nakamichi, Onkyo, Fisher Electronics, Technics (brand), Pioneer Corporation, Kenwood Corporation, JVC, Harman Kardon and Marantz. The brand was designed, built and marketed by Sharp in Japan.

The first series of receivers, the SA-2121, SA-3131, SA-4141 and SA-5151, were designed and built with silver front faces, knobs and switches. The SA-5151 was the most powerful unit, with minimum ratings of 85 watts RMS per channel into 8 Ohms from 20 Hz to 20 kHz with no more than .09% total harmonic distortion. The early line included a selection of AM-FM tuners and amplifiers (SM-4646, SM-3636 and ST-1515) that were of similar design and build characteristics as the receiver line. Tuners were analogue as were amps, and silver face plated with same switches and knobs. Cassette players and recorders were offered, most with the silver faceplates, but a small line known as the "designer series" offered a black faceplate in model number ST-1515B and SM-1515B for both tuner and amplifier respectively.

One notable product during the first run was their direct drive turntable RP-3636 that is sought after by collectors and audiophiles today due to the unique construction of Mikage granite stone that was developed by Optonica for use in turntable design. It was a compound that virtually eliminated feedback, thus preventing resonance from reaching the tonearm. The turntable was very heavy, weighing in at 35.4 pounds.

=== 1976–1978: Optonica SM-4646 ===
Sharp's 1975 introduction of Optonica filled the same role that Technics did for Panasonic's high-end audio display. When Optonica initially came into the public eye in 1976–1977, the market was already approaching a decline. Though Optonica is best known for its futuristic designs from the 1970s and '80s, which embodied Sharp's typical aesthetic, the company made separates even before then. The SM-4646 is one of such attempts.

The SM-4646 employs a 4-gang volume attenuator, three "Delta Power" power transformers, two enormous 13,600-F main caps, low-noise FETs, and differential amplifiers, with a total unit weight of 16 kg.The centre transformer supplies power to the preamp and driver stages in Class A, and the other two independent transformers power the L and R output stages in Class B.

In spite of earning a French Laurier d'Or (Golden Laurel) in 1977 for "outstanding function, design, and performances," Sharp's Optonica series never enjoyed good sales in France or anyplace else.

=== 1979–1982 ===
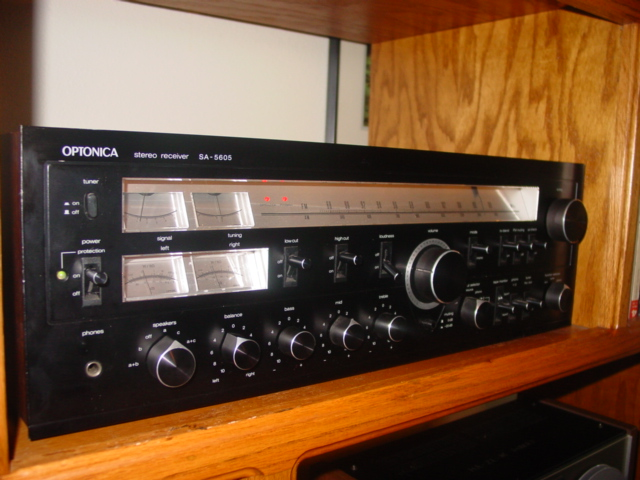
Optonica stereo receiver (Optonica SA-5605)

The second series was offered in 1979 and the line was expanded and redesigned with products that covered the entire spectrum of the high-end market. The receiver line consisted of model numbers SA-5901/5905, SA-5601/5605, SA-5401/5405, SA-5201/5205 and SA-5101/5105. The receivers were offered in both silver and black. The top of the line consisted of model numbers SA-5901 and SA-5905, and this series offered 125 watts minimum RMS per channel into 8 Ohms from 20 Hz-20 kHz with no more than 0.02% T.H.D. One of the unique features of the top-of-the-line product SA-5901/5905 and SA-5601/5605 was the ability to turn off the radio section while still using the receiver as an amplifier.

The top-of-the-line turntable RP-3636 was continued along with turntables from the original run. New tuners ST-4201/4205 were added to the existing line, and new amplifiers SM-3201/3205 were added. A computer-controlled cassette deck RT-6501/6505 was introduced, but was shared with an identical model Sharp cassette deck. Component cabinets SY-9406 and SY-800U were offered and an array of handles for the various components. In 1980 the line was expanded again, introducing unique design features into the products. The most notable was the dual-arm system turntable RP-7705, famous for an APLD (auto program locate device) that enabled the operator to select a cut on the album and the tone arm would automatically be placed on the desired song. This turntable had a sensor arm that was built next to the tonearm. The RP-4705 turntable was similar, but without the APLD system.

During this period Optonica still offered analog AM-FM tuners and amplifiers, but they were being eliminated, especially the high-powered and expensive models. The new digital tuners and amps were now offered with a Toroidal power transformer that allowed for high performance in a smaller size, offering two to three times the capacity of conventional transformers. This allowed for the new digital tuners and receivers to be much smaller in size, compared with the conventional line of analogue receivers, amps and tuners. Model numbers consisted of ST-7405 and ST-4405 for tuners and SM-7305 and SM-4305 for amplifiers. One notable product offering was SM-9005. An integrated amplifier featuring a new zero-switching direct coupled amp circuitry with 0% switching distortion. This amplifier produced 100 watts minimum RMS per channel into 8 ohms from 20 Hz to 20 kHz with no more than 0.0095% THD!.

The cassette recorder line was increased with unique computer-controlled devices, among them model number RT-6905. This cassette deck was large and heavy, weighing over 34 lbs.

The speaker line consisted of the original models offered in 1976, but model CP-5151 became CP-5151A, providing circuit protection.

All products came with a two-year parts and labor guarantee, and the speakers were given a five-year guarantee. Digital systems were offered with matched components consisting of an electronic time processor, electronic tape processor, electronic tuning processor, electronic stereo control amplifier, and electronic power amplifier. They were modernistic in design, with the 9100 series as the top-of-the-line. It was offered in silver and bronze colors, with lower output models being offered and sold as a complete system with matched components. The APLD turntable now offered model RP-9100 as a remote control turntable. A tape processor (RT-9100 H/HB) was offered, similar to the unit introduced in 1979. The speaker line was expanded with CP-9100HW the top offering, and lower output models matched to each lower output system, and others were available for separate use.

Separate component digital receivers were available. Model SA-5107, SA-5207, and SA-5407 were offered and a unique high powered amp (SM-110H) incorporated a freon cooling system to keep unit cool.

A last series of advanced turntable equipment was offered, most notably RP-114VL BLST, a linear tracking upright turntable, that could play both sides of a record without having to change sides. It was fully automatic and available in both silver and black. This technology was offered in many Sharp portable systems and stereo systems as well.

The end would come to Optonica in 1982 as a competitor in the high-end audio market; however, the brand would emerge in 1988 as a high-end line of stereo television receivers, portable cassette players and recorders, stereo Hi-Fi VCRs, voice-activated remote controls for VCRs, and a limited number of surround-sound receivers. Marketed for a few years, the line and brand would be discontinued in 1991.

== Products ==
Optonica's products were mainly hi-fi components such as single and dual cassette decks, turntables, speakers, receivers and amplifiers. Later Optonica products released from 1988 to 1991 included 20", 27", 32" CRT TVs, and VHS/S-VHS VCRs.
