= Onkyo TX-SR606 =

- Manufacturer: Onkyo
- Product family: TX-SR
- Type: AV receiver
- Released: 2008
- Dimensions: 435 x 174.5 x 375 mm
- Weight: Approx. 11 kg (25 lbs) (Note: North American: 11.3 kg (24.9 lbs.), European 11.4 kg (25.2 lbs.), Asian and Oceanian: with voltage selector model: 11.6 kg (25.6 lbs.), without voltage selector model: 11.3 kg (24.9 lbs))
- Predecessor: TX-SR605
- Successor: TX-SR607

The Onkyo TX-SR606 is Onkyo's AV receiver released in 2008. It is the successor to Onkyo TX-SR605 (2007). It was succeeded by Onkyo TX-SR607 (2009).

== Features ==
Compared to the TX-SR605, new features introduced are 1080i upscaling, two more HDMI ports (for a total of four), and dynamic equalization (EQ) technology. The remote is redesigned and includes HDMI CEC.

== Reception ==
Home Cinema Choice called the TX-SR606 "a superb entry-level receiver". What Hi-Fi? gave a positive review but said that "the Yamaha DSP-AX763 is the more mature, accomplished all-round listen." CNET wrote: "The Onkyo TX-SR606 offers tons of functionality for the price, but subpar video processing and improved competition means it's less of a standout receiver than last year's version." Sound & Vision said that in terms of performance, the TX-SR606 rivals much higher priced competitors.
