= Integra Home Theater =

Subdivision of Onkyo

- Company type: Public (subsidiary brand)
- Industry: Electronics
- Founded: 1976
- Products: Hi-fi and home theater Audio-Visual equipment
- Parent: Onkyo
- Website: www.integrahometheater.com

Integra is a subdivision of the Japanese manufacturer Onkyo, which produces electronics consisting of home theater receivers or AV receiver, CD player, DVD player and Blu-ray player. The brand is known for custom residential installation industry and offers products that integrate with home automation systems. The name "Integra" refers to integration and fusion. Introduced by Onkyo in 1969 as a brand name under which it could market its more premium products, Integra Research became its own division in 2000.

Some home automation systems are ready to use with Integra products out of the box or have support / programming modules available for Integra products.

== Integra Serial Control Protocol ==
In the early 2000s, Integra and Onkyo developed the Integra Serial Control Protocol (ISCP) as a standardized method for external control of their audio and home theater equipment. Initially implemented over RS-232 connections, the protocol provided a uniform command structure for functions such as power control, input selection, and status reporting across multiple product lines. As network-capable receivers became common, ISCP was extended to operate over TCP/IP as eISCP, enabling IP-based control, device discovery, and integration with home automation systems while preserving compatibility with the original command model.
