= AV receiver =

Consumer electronics component

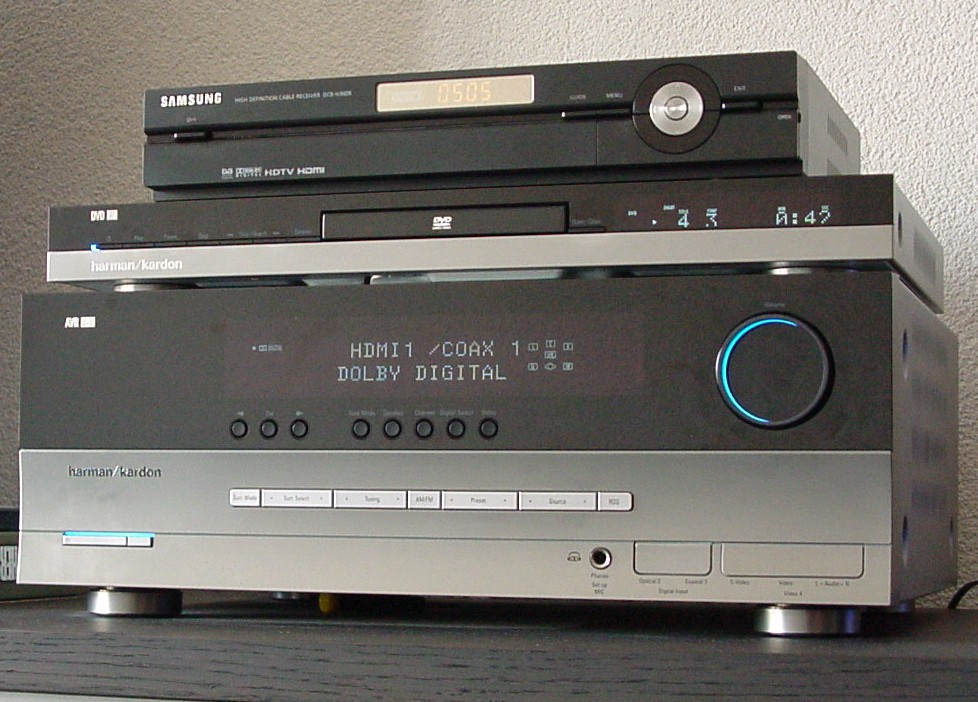
The Harman Kardon AVR 245 audio/video receiver is the large unit on the bottom. On top of it is a Harman/Kardon DVD player and Samsung set-top box.

An audio/video receiver (AVR, AV receiver) or a stereo receiver is a consumer electronics component used in a home theater, home audio, or hi-fi system. Its purpose is to receive audio and video signals from a number of sources, and to process them and provide power amplifiers to drive loudspeakers, and route the video to displays such as a television, monitor or video projector.

Inputs may come from a TV, FM, or AM tuner, satellite receiver, DVD players, Blu-ray Disc players, VCRs, video game consoles, or HTPCs, among others. The AVR source selection and settings, such as volume, are typically set by a remote control.

== History ==
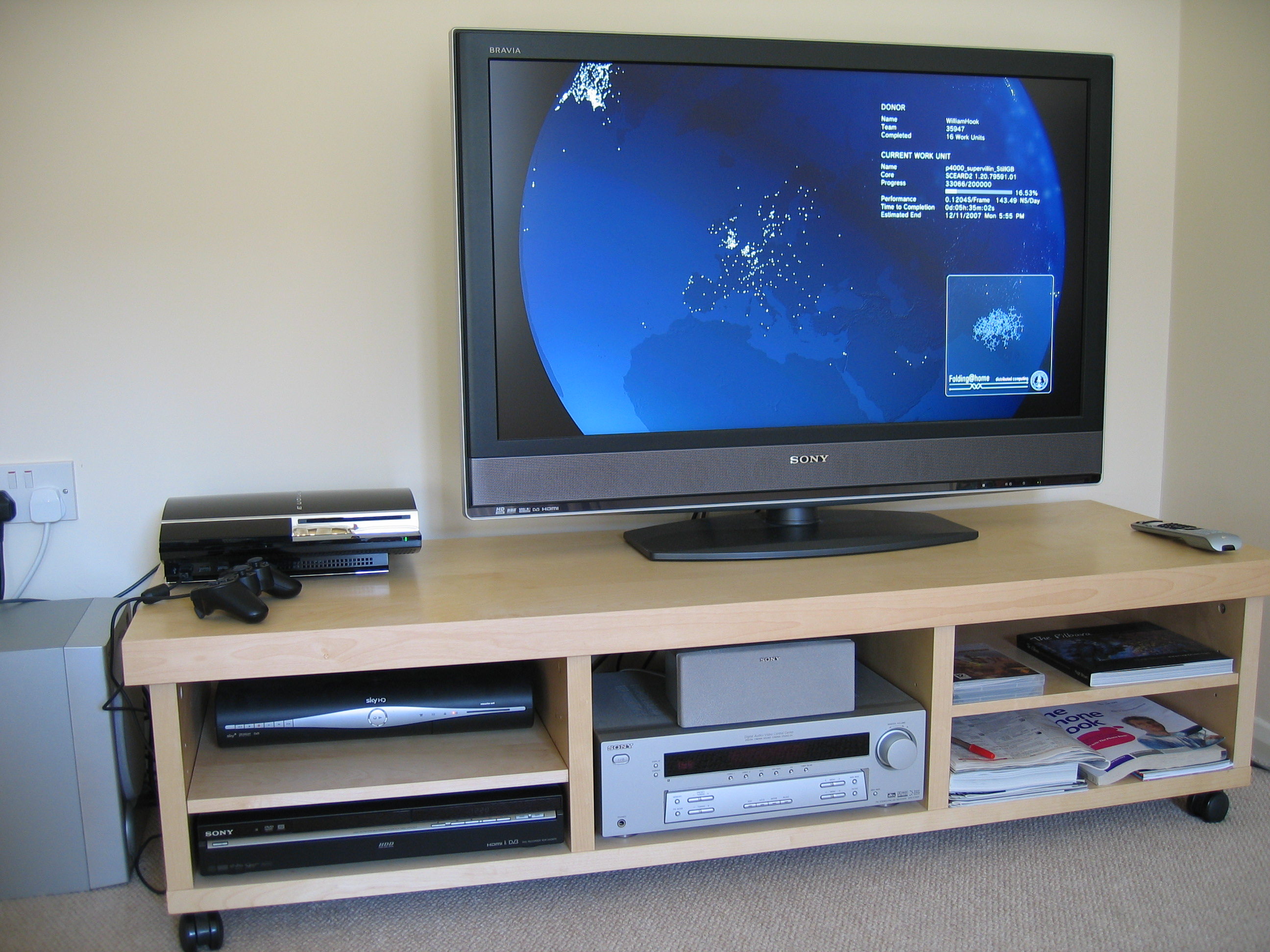
A mid-level home theater system shows an AV receiver in its usual entertainment center context. This setup consists of a large-screen LCD television, an AV receiver (the large unit on the lower middle shelf), a Sky+ HD Digibox satellite TV box, a DVD player, and a Blu-ray Disc-capable PlayStation 3 game console.

A receiver in its most basic form, the radio receiver, is an amplifier, typically at least a two-channel stereo model, that has a built-in radio tuner. Over time, features were integrated that would otherwise require separate pieces of equipment, such as preamplifiers, equalizers, and multiple power amplifiers. As home entertainment options expanded in the 1980s and 1990s, so did the role of the receiver. The ability to handle a variety of digital audio signals was added. More amplifiers were added to support surround sound. Video switching was added to simplify changing from one device to another. The term audio/video receiver (AVR) or home theater receiver evolved to distinguish this video-capable multi-channel receiver from the simpler stereo receiver.

=== AV receiver ===
The basic functionality of an AV receiver is to receive an audio signal, amplify the audio signal to drive multiple speakers and allow pass-through of the corresponding video signal to a display device such as a projector or a television. They are designed to handle five or more input channels in various configurations that are compatible with both audio and video, and typically accommodate HDMI inputs as well as support for surround sound.

=== Stereo receiver ===
Sometimes known as an audio receiver. The fundamental purpose is to take the low-level audio signal of a turntable, CD player, radio tuner, or other device and boost it to a level that can drive speakers. They are typically designed with music listeners in mind, and feature two, or sometimes four, stereo channels with a focus on high-fidelity music playback.

== Features ==
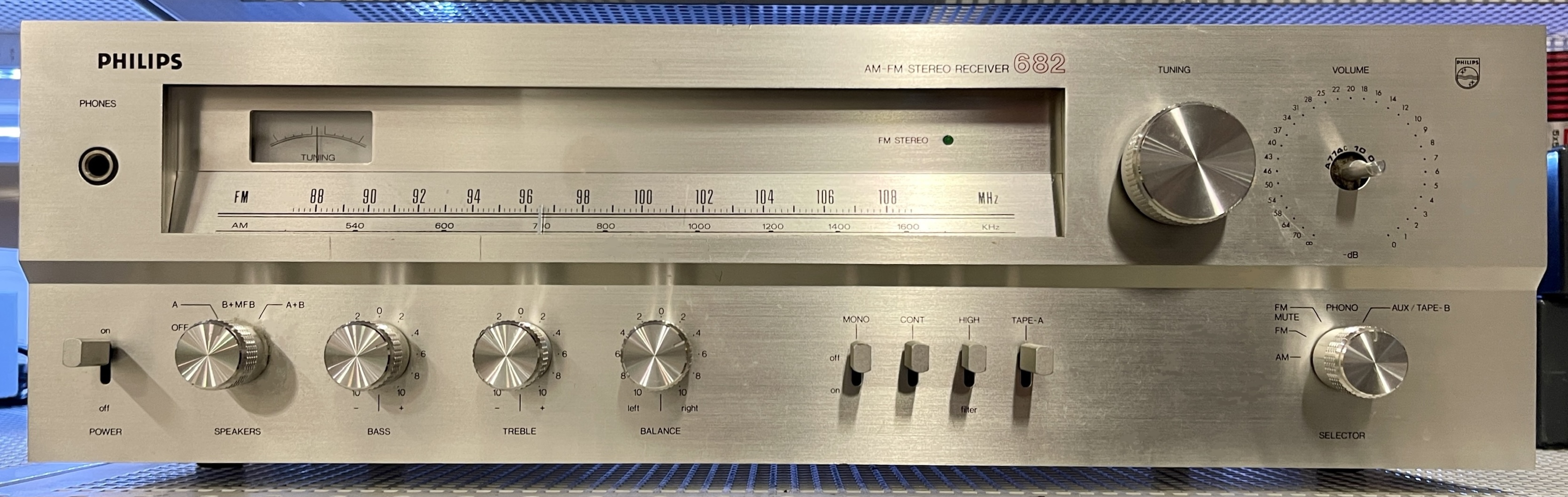
Philips AH682 AM/FM stereo receiver

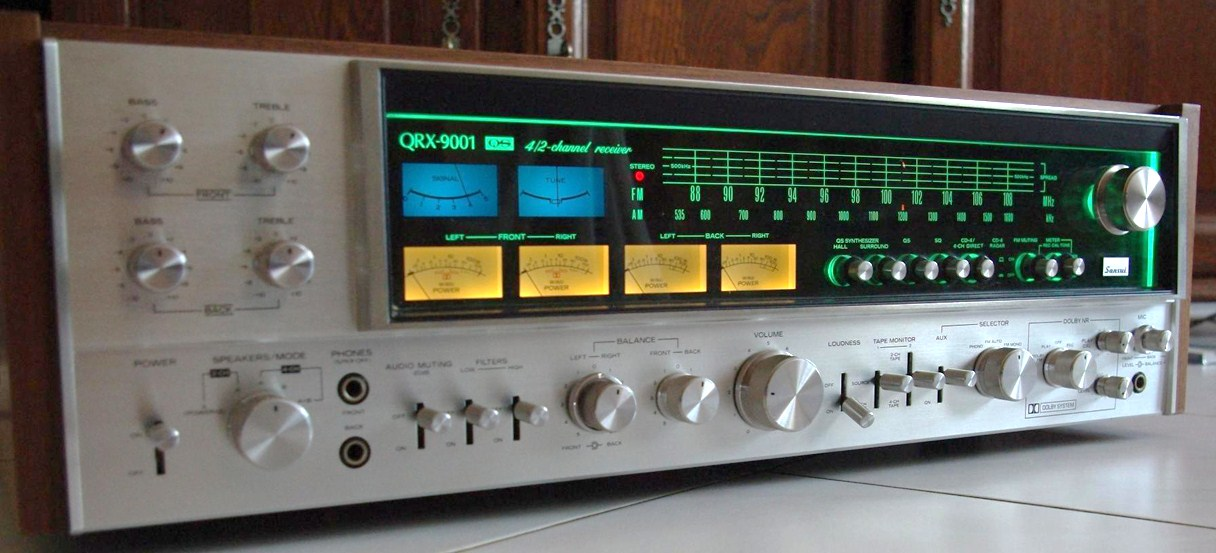
Sansui QRX-9001

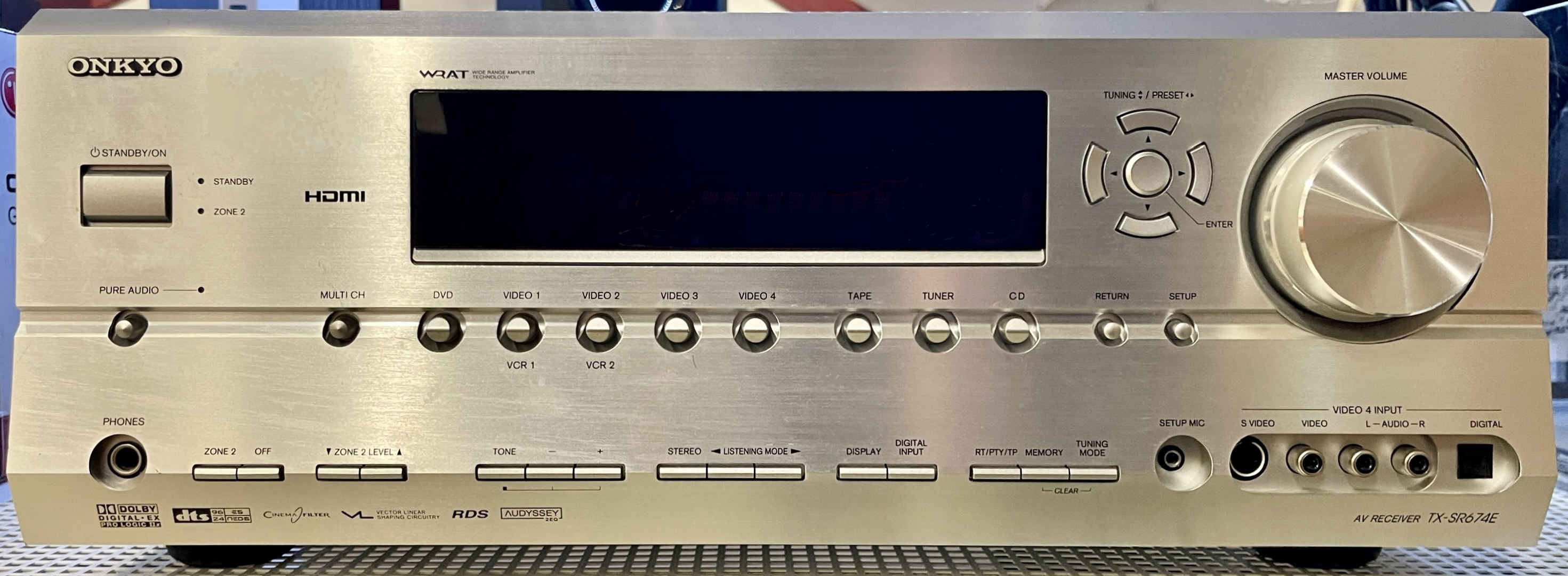
Onkyo TX-SR674E

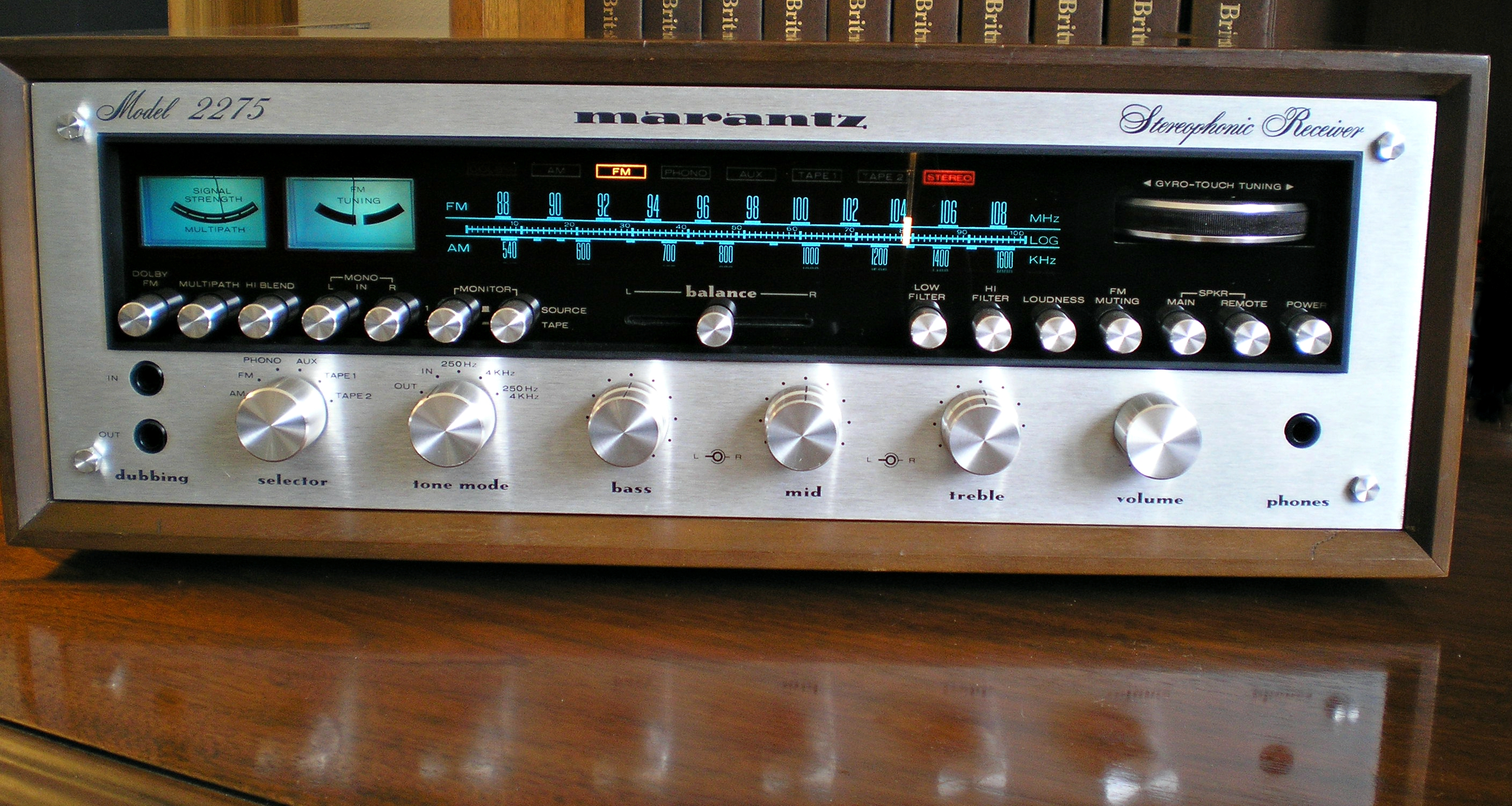
Marantz 2275

=== Channels ===
Stereo receivers have two channels of amplification (thus two separate amplifiers), while AV receivers may have more than two. The standard for AV receivers is five channels of amplification (thus five separate amplifiers), usually referred to as 5.1 receivers. This provides for a left, right, center, left surround sound and right surround sound speaker to be powered by the receiver.

In the 2010s, 7.1 receivers became more common and provided for two additional surround channels, left rear surround and right rear surround. The .1 refers to the low-frequency effects channel, the signal of which is usually sent to an amplified subwoofer unit. 5.1 and 7.1 receivers do not usually provide amplification for this channel. Instead, they provide a line level output. The user then either buys a monophonic power amp for their subwoofer or obtains a powered subwoofer cabinet containing an integrated power amplifier.

=== Amplifier power ===
Audio amplifier power, normally specified in watts, is not always as significant as it may seem from the specification. Due to the logarithmic nature of human hearing, audio power or sound pressure level (SPL), must be increased by ten times to sound twice as loud. This is why SPL is measured on a logarithmic scale in decibels (dBs). An increase of 10 dB results in a perceived doubling of loudness. Another complication with human hearing is that as the SPL decreases the perceived volume of the low and high frequencies decreases faster than the central frequencies around 2 kHz.

There are different standards for rating amplifier power depending on country, manufacturer, and model. Other factors also come into play: distortion, headroom, and speaker efficiency. Some lower-price-point manufacturers advertise an amplifier's peak power, rather than its root mean square (RMS) power. Thus, it is possible for an amplifier with a specified lower power to sound louder than an amplifier with a specified higher power. Because of these factors, it is not easy to compare the perceived loudness of amplifiers solely from their specified power in watts.

=== Decoders ===
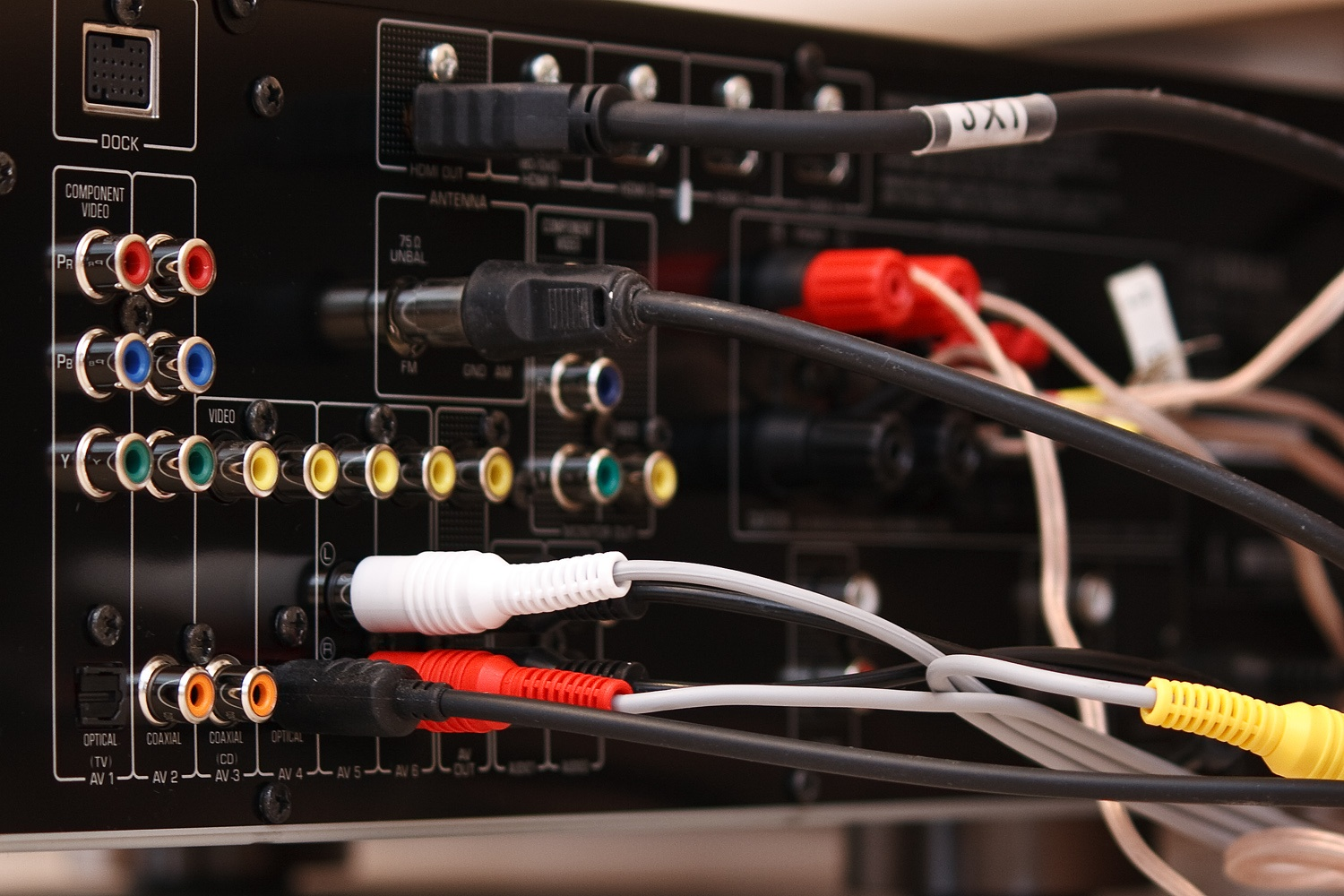
Yamaha 5.1 surround sound system

AV receivers usually provide one or more decoders for sources with more than two channels of audio information. This is most common with movie soundtracks, which use one of a variety of different types of encoding formats.

The first common soundtrack format was Dolby Pro Logic, a surround sound processing technology. This format contains a center channel and a surround channel mixed into the left and right channels using a process called matrixing, providing a total of four channels. Receivers with Dolby Pro Logic decoders can separate out the center and surround channels from the left and right channels.

With the introduction of the DVD, the Dolby Digital format became a standard. Dolby Digital ready receivers included inputs and amplifiers for the additional channels. Most current AV receivers provide a Dolby Digital decoder and at least one digital S/PDIF input, which can be connected to a source that provides a Dolby Digital output.

A somewhat less common surround sound decoder called DTS is standard on current AV receivers.

When Dolby Labs and DTS introduced technologies to add a rear center surround channel, these technologies found their way into AV Receivers. Receivers with six amplifiers (known as 6.1 receivers) will typically have both Dolby and DTS's technologies. These are Dolby Digital EX and DTS ES.

Dolby introduced Dolby Pro Logic II to allow stereo sources to play back as if they were encoded in surround sound. DTS introduced a similar technology, Neo:6. These decoders have become common on most current receivers.

As the number of playback channels was increased on receivers, other decoders have been added to some receivers. For example, Dolby Labs created Dolby Pro Logic IIx to take advantage of receivers with more than five channels of playback.

With the introduction of high definition players (e.g., Blu-ray Disc and HD DVD), yet more decoders have been added to some receivers. Lossless Dolby TrueHD and DTS-HD Master Audio decoders are available on many receivers.

While Dolby Digital has been the standard for television and video games, Dolby Digital Plus has been adopted for online streaming services such as Netflix, due to scaling better to lower bit rates. Dolby Digital Plus also adds support for higher bit rates and more channels than standard Dolby Digital.

Dolby Atmos and DTS:X add in ceiling height channels.

=== DSP effects ===
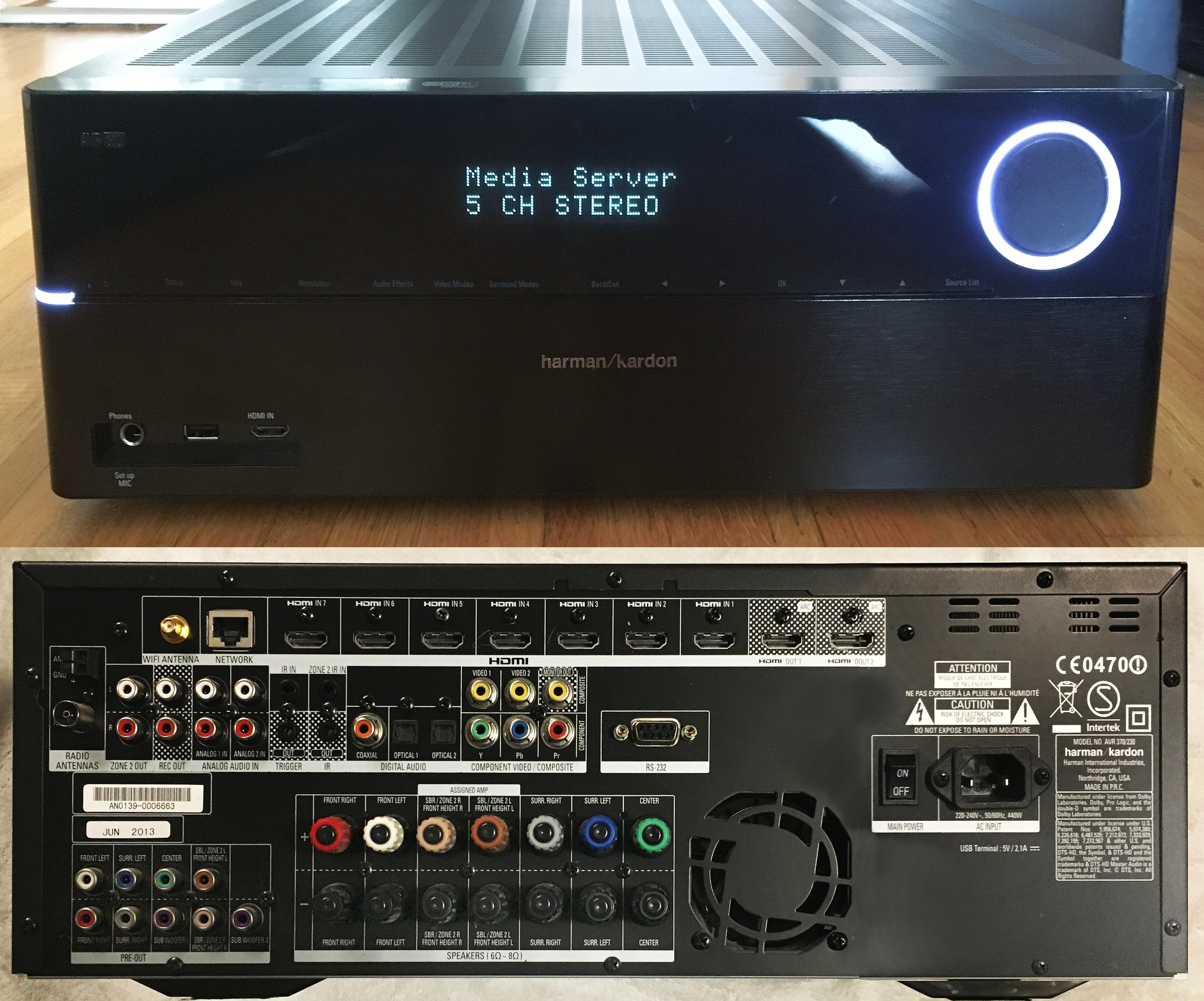
Harmon Kardon AVR 370 front and back

Most receivers offer specialized digital signal processors (DSP) made for handling various presets and audio effects. Some may offer simple equalizers and balance adjustments to complex DSP audio field simulations such as "Hall", "Arena", "Opera", etc., that simulate or attempt to replicate the reverb as if the audio were being played in the places through use of surround sound and echo effects.

=== AV inputs/outputs ===
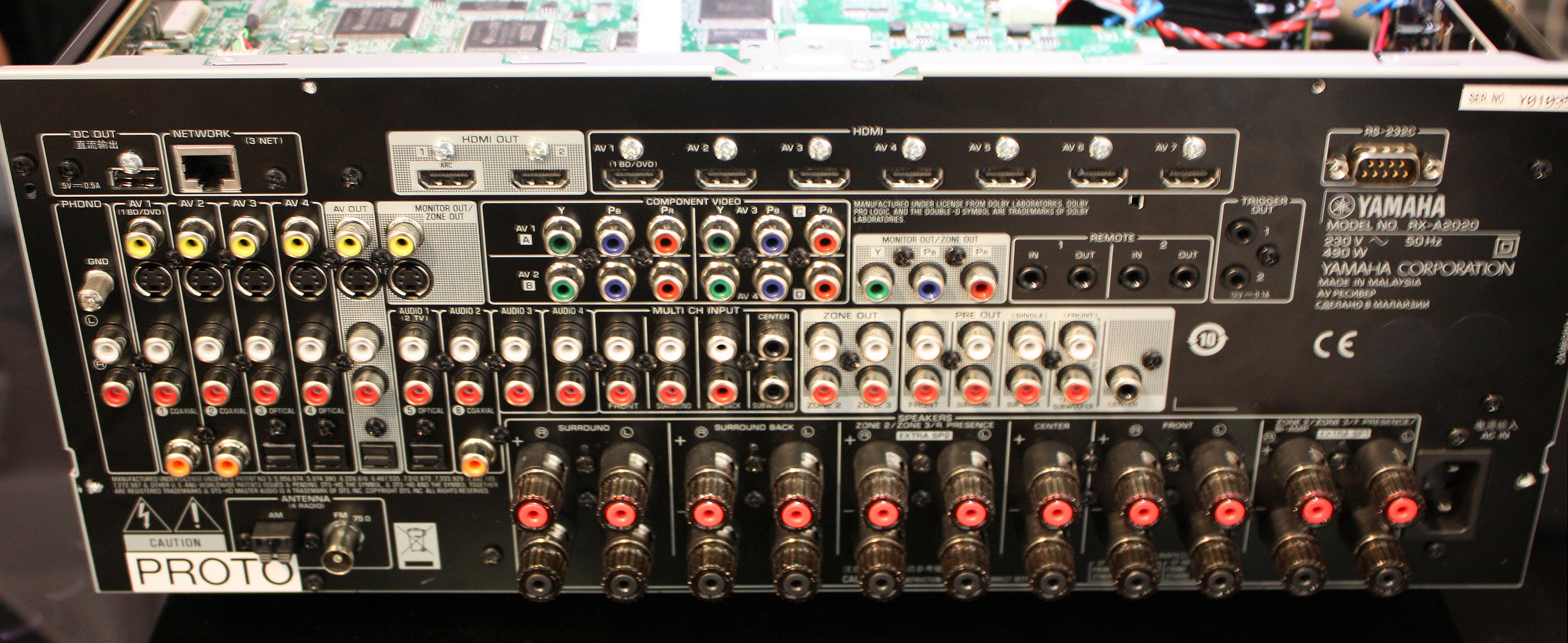
The AV connections are arrayed in a patch bay at the rear of a unit. Shown here is a 2012 Yamaha AV receiver. The top cover of the unit, which is normally attached, has been removed. In the enlarged view of the image, all individual connectors are marked and described.

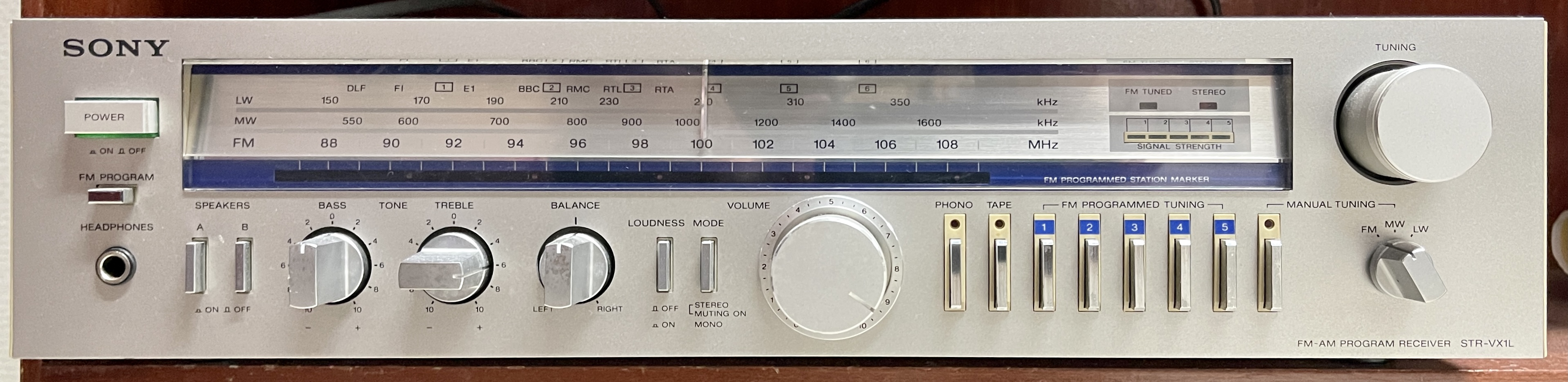
Sony STR-VX1L

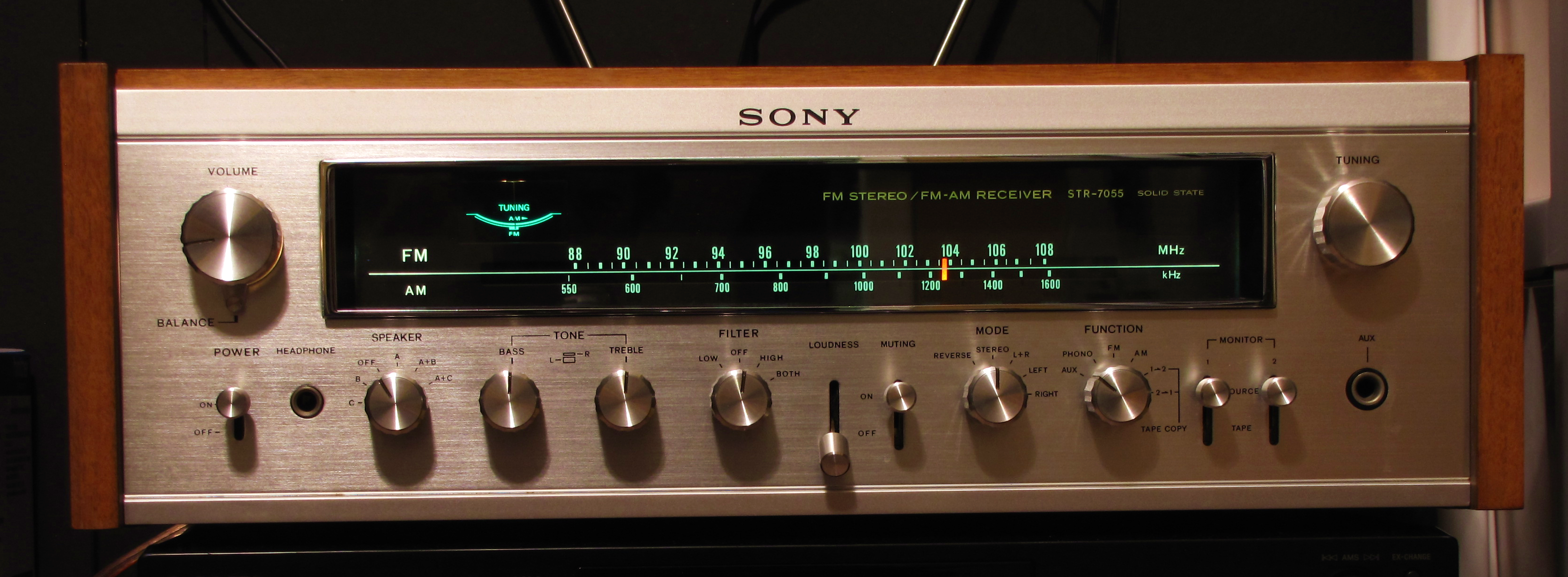
Sony STR-7055

There are a variety of possible connections on an AV receiver. Standard connectors include:

- Analog audio (RCA connector for active speakers, or speaker terminals for passive speakers)
- Digital audio (S/PDIF; TOSLINK or RCA terminated coaxial cable)
- Composite video (RCA connector)
- S-Video
- SCART video (primarily used in Europe and very uncommon in many other parts of the world)
- Component video
- HDMI
- USB (usually involves special USB circuitry to read video formats from a file system)

Analog audio connections usually use RCA plugs in stereo pairs. Inputs and outputs are both common. Outputs are provided mainly for cassette tape decks.

Analog audio connections using XLR (Balanced) connectors are uncommon and are usually found on more expensive receivers.

Some receivers are also equipped with phono inputs for connecting a turntable with a magnetic cartridge, although many receivers lack this input. In recent years, since vinyl players are regaining popularity, there are some manufacturers of A/V receivers that are offering a phono input on some models. Some receivers also have a selector for either MM/MC cartridge type, or even an impedance selector for the cartridge, or some may have more than one phono input. This feature is mainly offered to allow people owning a turntable to connect it and listen to their vinyl collection. Most receivers will only play in stereo, either front or main speakers, but some receivers may play on all speakers, depending on the manufacturer and model.

Digital connections allow for the transmission of PCM, Dolby Digital or DTS audio. Common devices include CD players, DVD players, or satellite receivers.

Composite video connections use a single RCA plug on each end. Composite video is standard on all AV receivers, allowing for the switching of video devices such as VHS players, cable boxes, and game consoles. DVD players may be connected via composite video connectors, although a higher bandwidth connection is recommended.

S-Video connections offer better quality than composite video. It uses a DIN jack.

SCART connections generally offer the best quality video at standard-definition, due to the use of pure RGB signalling (although composite and S-Video may alternatively be offered over a SCART connector). SCART provides video and audio in one connection.

Component video has become the best connection for analog video as higher definitions, such as 720p have become common. The YPbPr signalling provides a good compromise between resolution and colour definition.

HDMI has become the de facto standard for passing video and audio on AV receivers. Features supported through HDMI may include pass-through of 4K, 8K, and HDR video, audio return channel (ARC), enhanced audio return channel (eARC), variable refresh rate (VRR), and pass-through of object-based audio formats such as Dolby Atmos and DTS:X.

=== Video conversion and upscaling ===
Some AV Receivers can convert from one video format to another. This is commonly called upconversion or transcoding. A smaller number of receivers provide for de-interlacing of video signals. For example, a receiver with upconversion, deinterlacing and upscaling can take an interlaced composite signal at 480i (480 lines per frame sent as a field of 240 even numbered lines 0,2,4,8...478 followed by a field of 240 odd numbered lines 1,3,5,...479) and convert it to component video while also deinterlacing and upscaling it to a higher resolution such as 720p (720 lines per frame with all lines in normal sequence 0,1,2...719).

=== Radio on AVRs ===
AV receivers, though primarily used for amplification, may or may not have an inbuilt AM/FM radio tuner among other features such as LAN connectivity for various Internet applications, and some with multi-room audio solutions.

Even though some AVRs may have an AM/FM tuner, it is not a primary or mandatory function, as an AVR still remains an amplifier.

Some models have HD Radio tuner. Also, some models may have a digital radio, DAB/DAB+, for some markets.

Some models have Internet radio and PC streaming access capabilities with an Ethernet port or Wi-Fi.

=== Built in media player ===
Some receivers would included built in cassette decks and were referred to as casseivers.

In the 2000s, CD receivers were introduced and became more prominent in small stereo systems. This was due to parts and components becoming smaller and more powerful, so they could be better integrated into stereo systems. The only difference between these and other receivers is that they did not come with phono stages built in as records were not popular during the 2000s. Today, CD receivers are still made with phono stages included in the systems and added modern features like the ability to stream music.

Companies also released AV receivers that featured built-in DVD players for an all-in-one home theater setup. Blu-Ray players eventually made their way to AV receivers with some even offering the ability to play 3D Blu-Ray discs.

== Integra Serial Control Protocol ==
In the early 2000s, Integra and Onkyo developed the Integra Serial Control Protocol (ISCP) as a standardized method for external control of their audio and home theater equipment. Initially implemented over RS-232 connections, the protocol provided a uniform command structure for functions such as power control, input selection, and status reporting across multiple product lines. As network-capable receivers became common, ISCP was extended to operate over TCP/IP as eISCP, enabling IP-based control, device discovery, and integration with home automation systems while preserving compatibility with the original command model.

The protocol is also used Integra, Onkyo, Pioneer, Teac, Denon with built-in HEOS, and Marantz AV receivers.

== See also ==
- THX
- Digital media player
- Home cinema
- Home theater PC (HTPC)
