= Onkyo =

Japanese electronics company

Onkyo オンキヨー
- Logo used since 2024
- Native name: オンキヨー
- Romanized name: Onkyō
- Type: Joint venture
- Industry: Electronics
- Founded: Osaka, Japan September 17, 1946; 80 years ago as Osaka Denki Onkyo K.K
- Headquarters: Osaka, Japan Onkyo Technology Corporation (research and development / engineering); Indianapolis, Indiana, U.S. Premium Audio Company (brand and commercial management)
- Area served: Worldwide
- Key people: Paul Jacobs (president and CEO, Premium Audio Company)
- Products: Hi-fi and home theater Audio-Visual equipment, ICs, speaker units and related items
- Owner: Premium Audio Company Gentex Corporation (75%); Sharp Corporation (25%)
- Divisions: Integra Home Theater
- Website: onkyo.com

Onkyo (オンキヨー, Onkyō) is a Japanese consumer electronics brand specializing in premium home cinema and audio equipment, including AV receivers, surround sound speakers and hi-fi electronics.

The business was founded in 1946 under the name Osaka Denki Onkyo K.K. (a company not related to Nippon Denki Onkyo, which became Denon). Historically, the Japanese manufacturer expanded its umbrella to include the Integra and Integra Research divisions alongside the main Onkyo brand. After acquiring Pioneer's home electronics division in 2015, the business later renamed itself Onkyo Home Entertainment Corporation in 2020.

Following the 2022 bankruptcy of Onkyo Home Entertainment Corporation, the business was split into two separate companies. The consumer home audio business and brand assets were acquired by Japanese Sharp Corporation and American Premium Audio Company (a subsidiary of Voxx International Corporation, which was subsequently acquired by Gentex Corporation in 2025), under which the Onkyo brand continues to develop and release home audio products with engineering operations in Osaka, Japan and brand management in Indianapolis, United States.

Onkyo Corporation (オンキヨー株式会社), operates independently as a small firm solely in Japan outside of consumer home cinema, focusing on brand licensing, digital hearing aids and acoustic and vibration technologies.

== Name ==
The word Onkyo translates as "sound resonance". On (音) is from Chinese pronunciation, with traditional Japanese pronunciation as Oto, meaning "sound". Kyo (響) is also from Chinese pronunciation, pronounced as Hibiki (noun) or Hibiku (verb) in traditional Japanese, meaning "resound, sound, or echo".

Moreover, the Japanese term Onkyo (音響) is not limited to the sense of “sound resonance.” It is also widely used to describe acoustics, as in the quality of sound in a room, while in industrial and practical usage it commonly refers to audio equipment or devices.

== History ==
Former Onkyo logo (1977–2024), still used by Onkyo Corporation in Japan

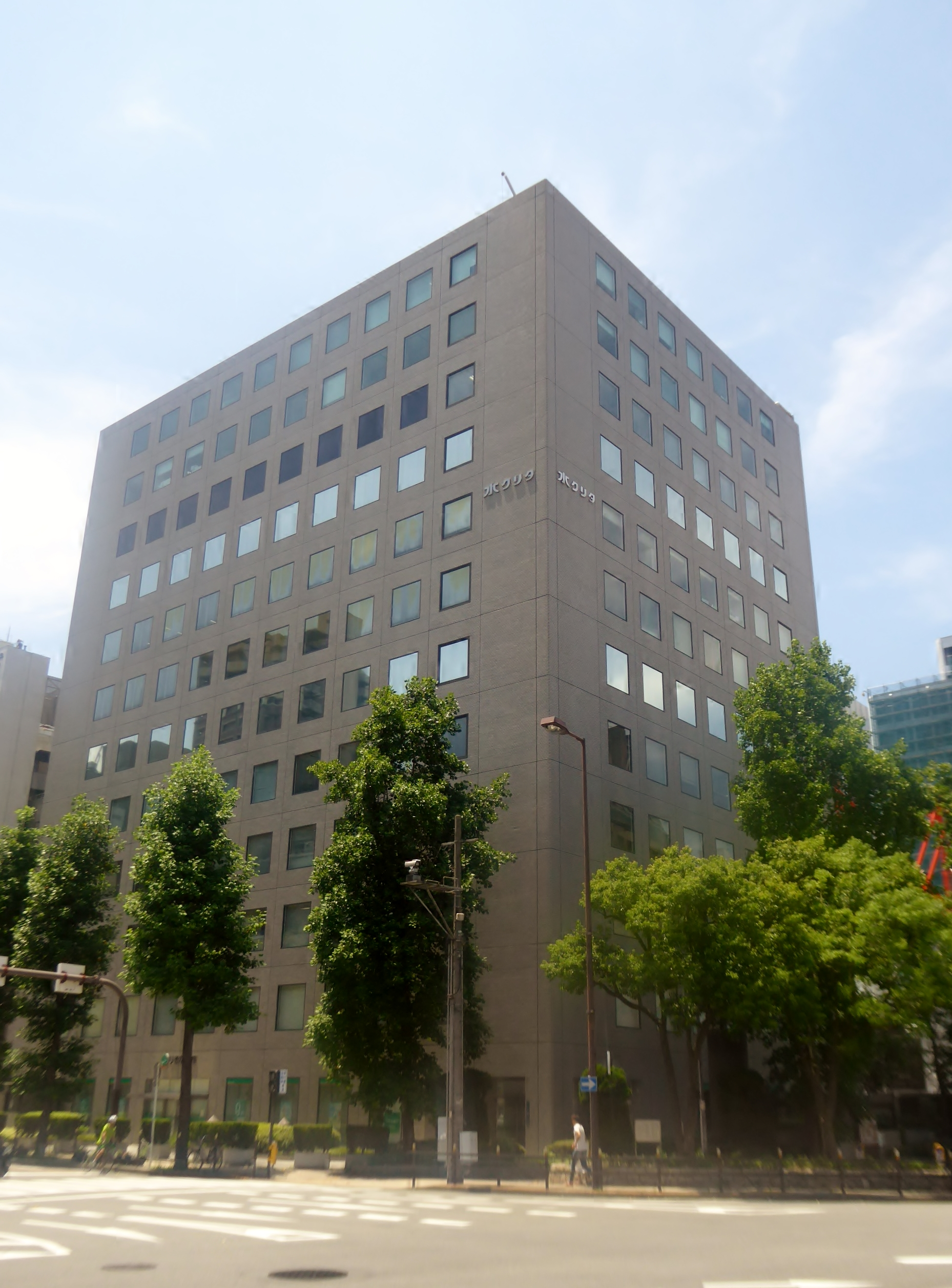
Kitahama Central Building in Osaka, a former headquarters of Onkyo

Onkyo was founded by Takeshi Goda in 1946 while he worked in sound at Matsushita Electric. It was renamed Osaka Onkyo in 1947. The company name changed from Osaka Onkyo K.K. to Onkyo Corporation in 1971.

The Integra amplifier series was introduced in 1969. In 1993, Onkyo acquired Lucasfilm's THX certification and then launched the first ever THX-certified AV consumer receiver.

In March 2015, Onkyo purchased Pioneer Corporation's Home Electronics Corporation, which produces home cinema amplifiers, Blu-ray players and other AV products. In return, Pioneer took a 14.95% stake in Onkyo. The Ohtsuki family remained the largest shareholders of the company with an approximately 26% stake, just above Gibson Brands, with a 16.5% stake.

With the bankruptcy of Gibson in 2018, Onkyo's shares held by Gibson were sold.

In May 2021, Voxx International and Sharp Corporation began negotiations with Onkyo to purchase its home audiovisual division. Voxx's subsidiary Premium Audio Company (PAC) entered a joint venture with Sharp to acquire the business, which includes the Onkyo and Integra brands, for $30.8 million and the assumption of certain debt plus payment of commissions to Onkyo in future.

Due to prolonged financial losses and negative net worth, Onkyo Corporation was delisted from the Tokyo Stock Exchange in August 2021. The following month, the company completed the sale of its core home audio-video business to a joint venture between Premium Audio Company (PAC) and Sharp Corporation. Under the agreement, PAC took a 75% stake to manage product development, engineering, sales, marketing, and distribution, while Sharp held 25% to oversee manufacturing and supply chain operations.

Despite offloading its main AV division, Onkyo's remaining subsidiary, Onkyo Home Entertainment Corporation, filed for bankruptcy on May 13, 2022. A professor noted in The Asahi Shimbun that the company had prioritized manufacturing quality at the expense of adapting to changing market conditions, as smartphones largely displaced the mid-range hi-fi segment.

Two months after the bankruptcy filing, PAC and Sharp acquired the subsidiary's remaining home audio intellectual property and assets, while PAC continued distributing Onkyo, Integra, Pioneer and Pioneer Elite products through its 11 Trading Company subsidiary. Meanwhile, the original Japanese parent, Onkyo Corporation, survived independently outside of consumer AV, retaining brand ownership and focusing on licensing, hearing aids and acoustic services. As a result, the consumer home audio business and the original Japanese corporation now operate as two entirely separate companies.

In late 2024, PAC unveiled a major brand relaunch ("All-New Onkyo") featuring an updated logo, a new research and innovation center and a broader push into home speakers and specialty hi-fi electronics.

To mark its 80th anniversary in 2026, Onkyo further expanded its lineup with new network streaming amplifiers, updated AV receivers and limited-edition anniversary models.

== Products ==
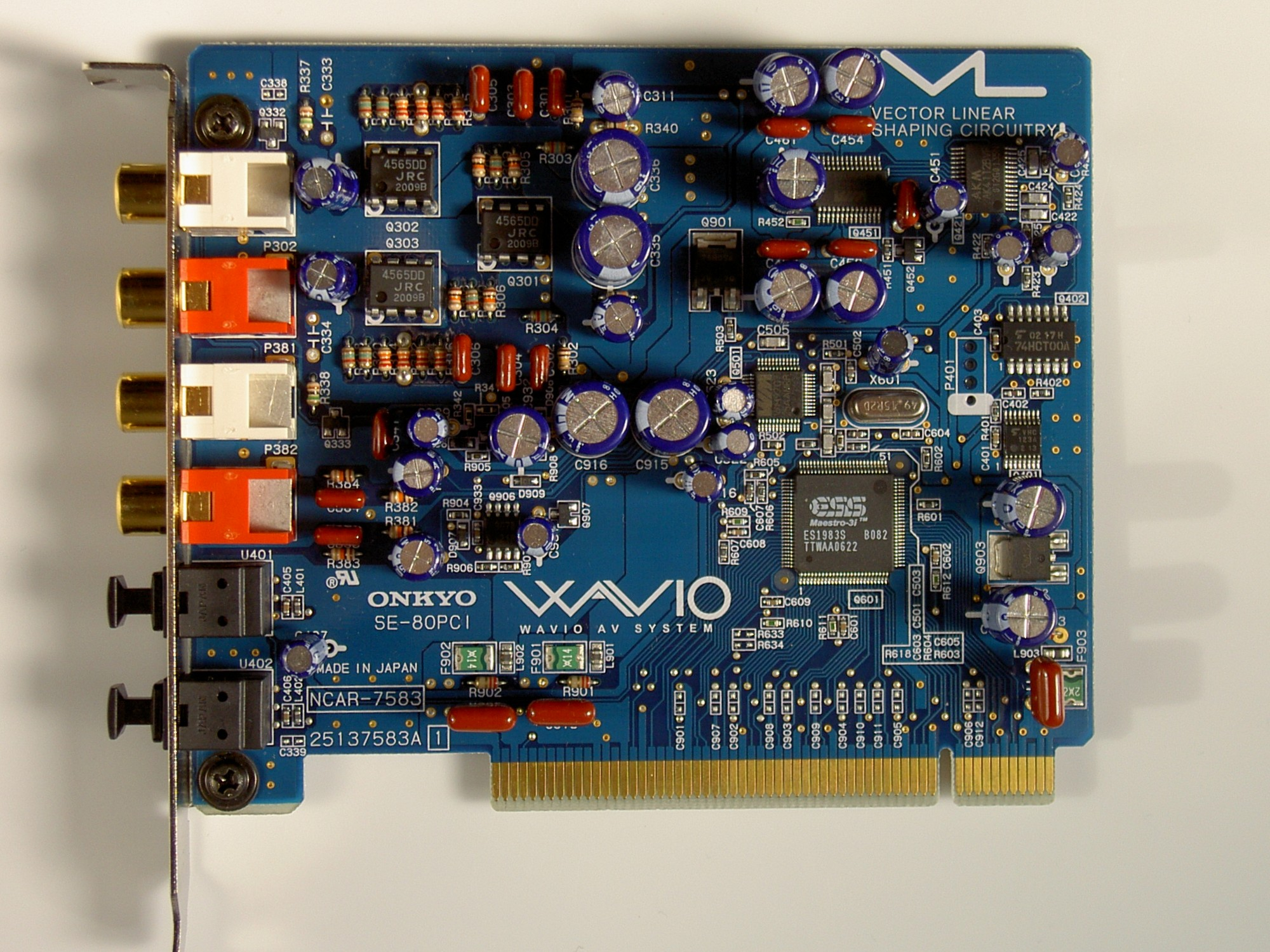
Onkyo Wavio SE-80PCI PC sound card

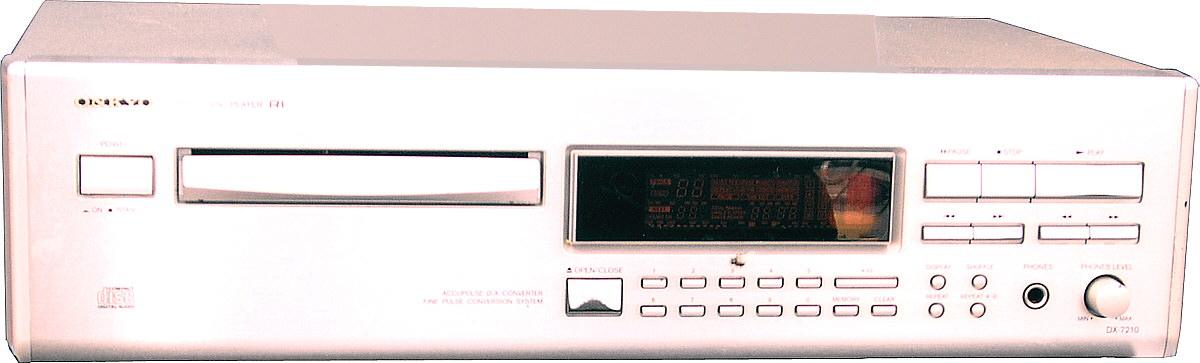
Onkyo DX7210 CD player

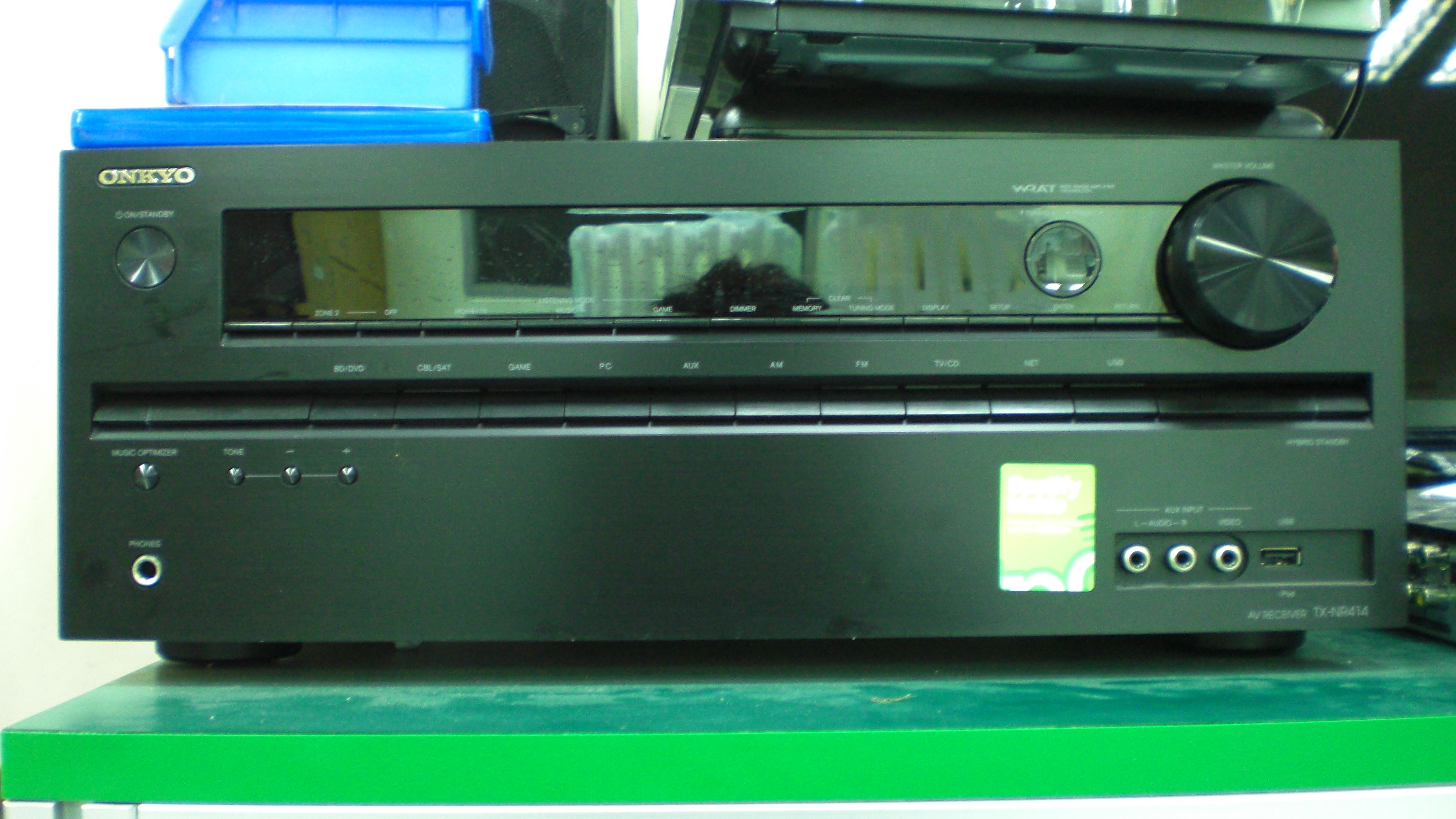
Onkyo TX-NR414 5.1 surround sound AV receiver

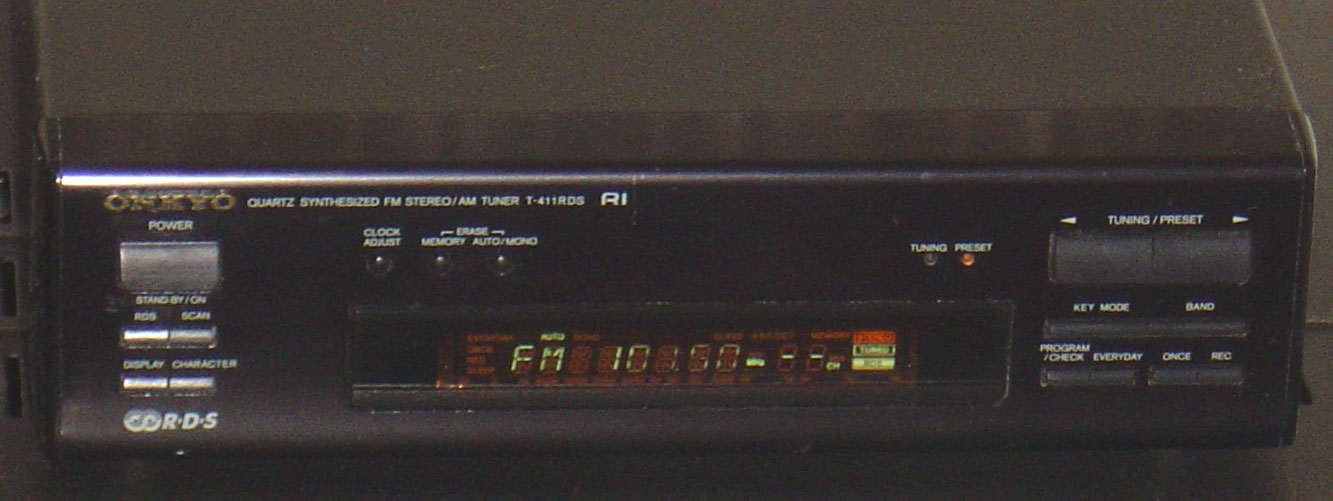
Onkyo T-411RDS tuner
