= Home cinema =

Home entertainment system that aims to replicate the experience of a movie theater

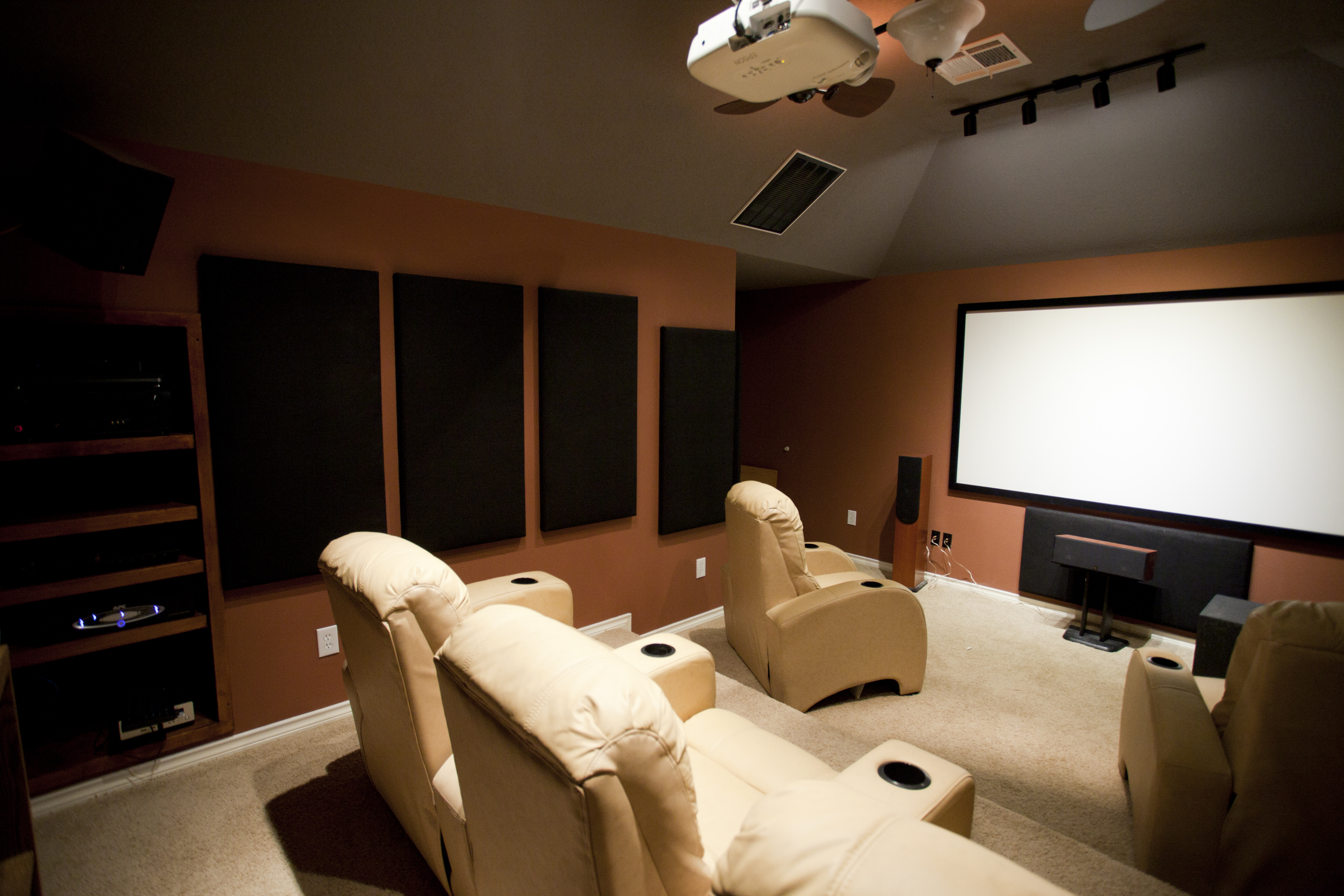
A dedicated home cinema room with acoustic treatment, professional wiring, equipment and speaker placing, and a digital projector and screen

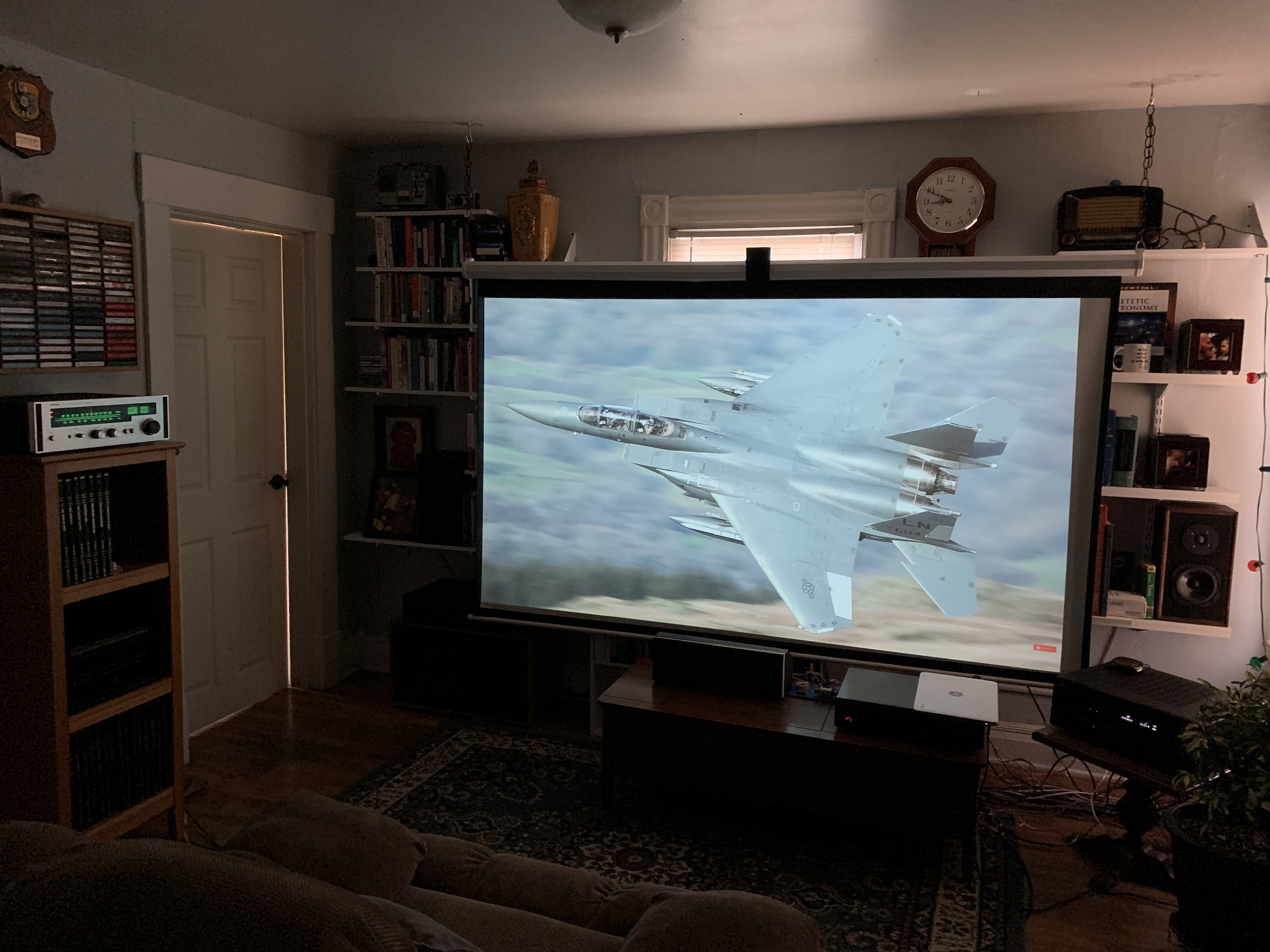
Home theatre room with 100" pull down screen

A home cinema, also called home theater, is an audio-visual system that seeks to reproduce a movie theater experience and mood in private homes using consumer grade electronic video and audio equipment for watching home video or streaming.

In the 1980s, home cinemas typically consisted of a movie pre-recorded on a LaserDisc or VHS tape; a LaserDisc Player or VCR; and a large-screen cathode-ray tube TV set, although sometimes CRT projectors were used instead. In the 2000s, technological innovations in sound systems, video player equipment, TV screens and video projectors changed the equipment used in home cinema set-ups and enabled home users to experience a higher-resolution screen image, improved sound quality and components that offer users more options (e.g., many Blu-ray players can also stream movies and TV shows over the Internet using subscription services such as Netflix). The development of Internet-based subscription services means that 2020s-era home theatre users do not have to commute to a video rental store as was common in the 1980s and 1990s.

In the 2020s, a home cinema system typically uses a large projected video image or a large flatscreen high-resolution HDTV system, a movie or other high-definition video content, with multi-channel audio and anywhere from two speakers to five or more surround sound speaker cabinets and at least one low-frequency subwoofer speaker cabinet to amplify low-frequency effects from movie soundtracks and reproduce the deep pitches from musical soundtracks.

== Introduction ==
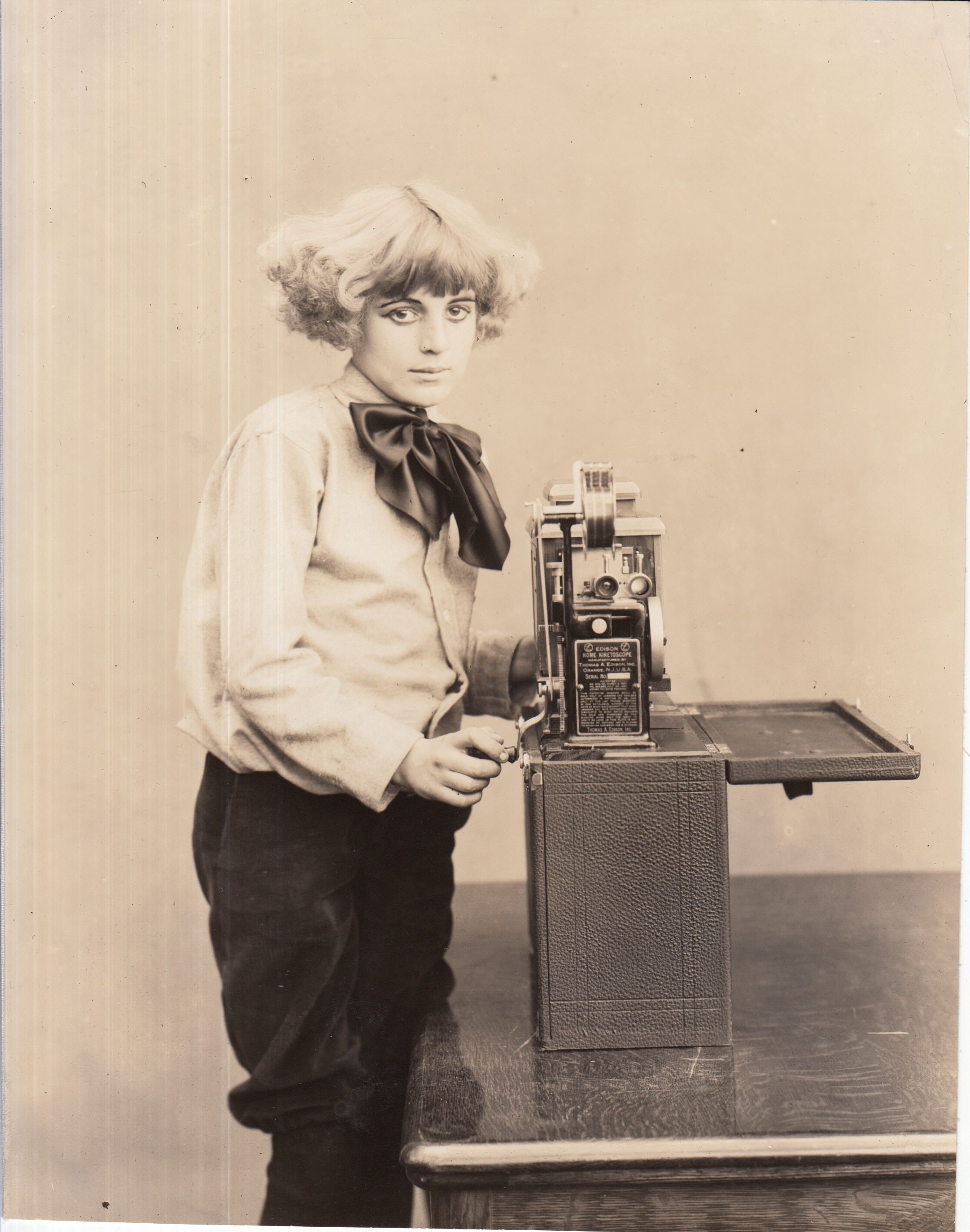
1912 publicity photo for the Edison Home Projecting Kinetoscope

Introduced in 1912, the Edison Home Projecting Kinetoscope was one of the first home theater devices. Although it used a 22 mm film format, the image size was nearer to 6 mm, the smallest ever to be commercially released. The film was perforated not only on the edges, but also in two interior rows, dividing each frame into three separate images. The film was run through once for the first set of outside images; the gate was shifted over and the film run backwards for the interior row of images; then the gate was shifted once more to project the other outside row. The value was that an entire motion picture could be projected from one reel of film. However, its high cost - $175 on introduction - its distribution through Edison phonograph dealers who resented having to sell it, the difficulty of working the machine properly, and the graininess of the early safety film stock (made even more visible when projecting the 6 mm image) made it a commercial failure. Production stopped after the disastrous fire at Edison's West Orange, New Jersey factory complex in December 1914.

Home theater systems were made in the 1920s with 16 mm projectors. Technological improvements led to 8 mm and sound 16 mm in the 1930s. In the 1950s, playing home movies became popular in the United States with middle-class and upper-class families as Kodak 8 mm film projector equipment became more affordable. In the mid-1980s to the mid-1990s, a typical home cinema in the United States would have a LaserDisc or VHS player playing a movie, with the signal fed to a large rear-projection television set, with the audio output through a stereo system. Some people used expensive front projectors in a darkened viewing room. During the 1980s, watching movies on VHS at home became a popular leisure activity. Beginning in the late 1990s and continuing throughout much of the 2000s, home-theater technology progressed with the development of the DVD-Video format, surround sound speaker systems, and high-definition television (HDTV), which initially included bulky, heavy cathode-ray tube HDTVs and flatscreen TVs. The 2010s saw the introduction of affordable large HDTV flatscreen TVs, high resolution video projectors (e.g., DLP), 3D television technology and the high resolution Blu-ray (1080p).

Some studies show that films are rated better and generate more intense emotions when watched in a movie theater, but convenience is a major appeal for home cinemas.

The term home cinema encompasses a range of systems meant for movie playback at home. The most basic and economical system could be a digital media player, with large-screen television or a smart TV, and an inexpensive home theater in a box surround sound amplifier and speaker system with a subwoofer. A more expensive home cinema set-up might include a Blu-ray disc player, home theater PC (HTPC) computer or digital media receiver streaming devices with a 10-foot user interface, an event larger screen or projector and projection screen, and a several-hundred-watt AV receiver with five or more surround-sound speakers plus one or two powerful subwoofers.

Home cinema designs and layouts are a personal choice, and the type of home cinema a user can set up depends on their budget and the space that is available within the home. The minimum set of requirements for a home theater are: a large television set or good quality video projector, an AV receiver and amplifier combination capable of supporting surround sound, and something that plays movies such as a Blu-ray disc player, cable or satellite receiver, video game console, etc. Finally, a soundbar or a set of speakers, at least two, are needed but more common are anywhere from six to eight with a subwoofer for bass or low-frequency effects.

The most expensive home cinema set-ups, which can cost over US$100,000, have large, high-resolution digital projectors and projection screens, custom-built screening rooms that include cinema-style chairs and audiophile-grade sound equipment designed to mimic or exceed commercial cinema performance.

== Design ==
This chart shows some of the design flow options for home theatre in the 2000s.

Many home cinema enthusiasts aim to replicate, to the degree that is possible, the cinema experience. A typical home cinema includes the following components:

1. Movie or other viewing content: As the name implies, one of the key reasons for setting up a home cinema is to watch movies on a large screen, which does a more effective job at reproducing filmed images of vast landscapes or epic battle sequences. Home cinema enthusiasts using smart Blu-ray players may also watch DVDs of TV shows, and recorded or live sports events or music concerts. With a smart player, a user may be able to stream movies, TV shows and other content over the Internet. DVD players and Blu-ray players have provisions that allow users to view digital photos and other content on the big screen.
2. Video and audio input devices: One or more audiovisual sources. High-resolution movie media formats such as Blu-ray discs are normally preferred. Some home theaters include a Home theater PC (HTPC) with a media center software application to act as the main library for video and music content using a 10-foot user interface and remote control. Blu-ray players, digital media players and game consoles can stream movies and TV shows over the Internet.
3. Audio and video processing devices: Input signals are processed by either a standalone AV receiver for surround sound formats.
4. Audio output: Systems consist of preamplifiers, power amplifiers (both of which may be integrated into a single AV receiver) and two or more loudspeakers. The audio system requires at least a stereo power amplifier and two speakers, for stereo sound; most systems have multi-channel surround sound power amplifier and six or more speakers (a 5.1 surround sound system has left and right front speakers, a center speaker, left and right rear speakers and a low-frequency subwoofer).
5. Video output: A large-screen display, typically supporting HDTV. Some users may have a 3D TV. As of 2015, flat-screen HDTVs are the norm. Options include Liquid crystal display television (LCD), plasma TV, and OLED. Home cinema users may also use a video projector and a movie screen. If a projector is used, a portable, temporary screen may be used, a screen may be permanently mounted or the image may be projected directly on a prepared wall.
6. Seating and atmosphere: Comfortable seating is often provided to improve the cinema feel. Some luxury home cinemas have movie theater-style padded chairs for guests. Higher-end home theaters commonly also have sound insulation to prevent noise from escaping the room and specialized wall treatment to balance the sound within the room. Wall color can be optimized.

== Component systems vs. theater-in-a-box ==
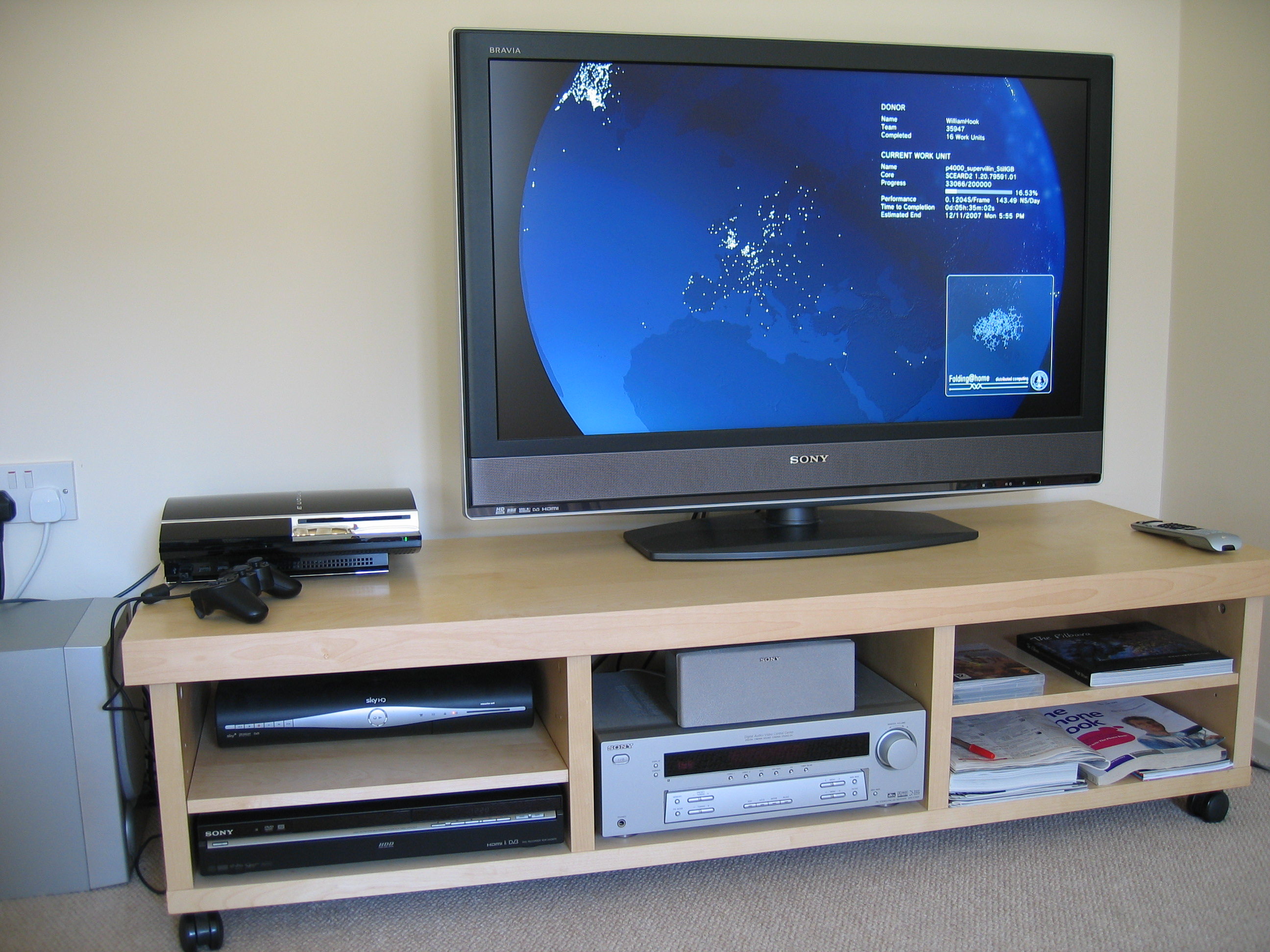
A mid-level home theater system consisting of large-screen BRAVIA television, a Sky+ HD satellite TV box, and a DVD player (and a Blu-ray Disc-capable PlayStation 3 game console). The equipment is on a TV stand.

Home cinemas can either be set up by purchasing individual components (e.g., buying a multichannel amp from one manufacturer, a Blu-ray player from another manufacturer, speakers from another company, etc.) or by purchasing a home theater in a box (HTIB) package which includes all components, excepting TV or projector, from a single manufacturer. HTIB systems typically include a DVD or Blu-ray player, a surround sound amplifier, five surround speakers, a subwoofer cabinet, cables and a remote. The benefit of purchasing separate components one by one is that consumers can better match the components to the needs of the consumer or a specific room.

However, to buy individual components, a consumer must have knowledge of sound system and video system design and electronics, and they must do research on the specifications of each component. One of the challenges with buying all the components separately is that the purchaser must understand speaker impedance, power handling, and HDMI compatibility and cabling. Given these challenges, HTIB systems can be a simpler and more cost-effective solution.

== Dedicated rooms ==
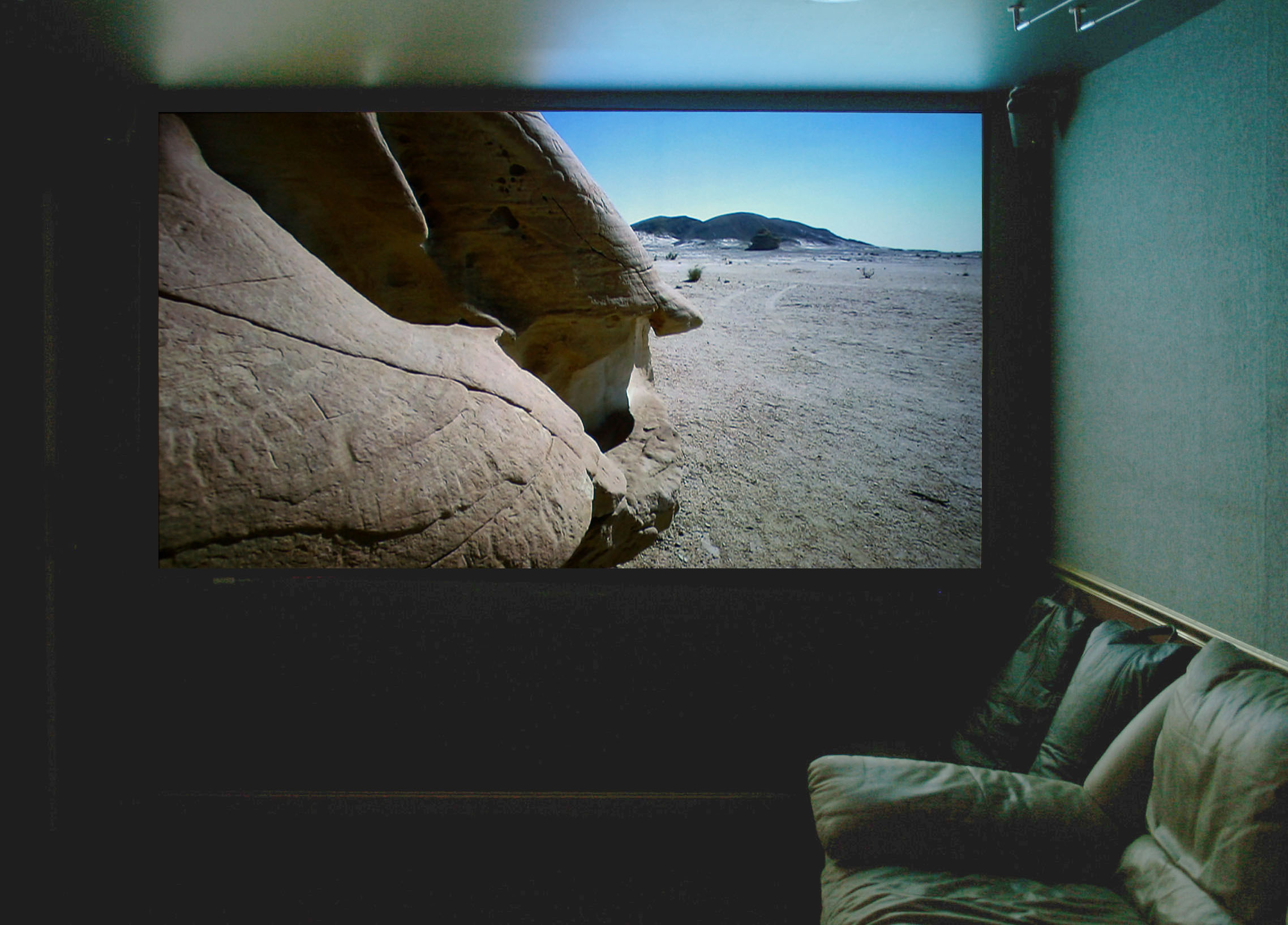
A large projection screen in a media room

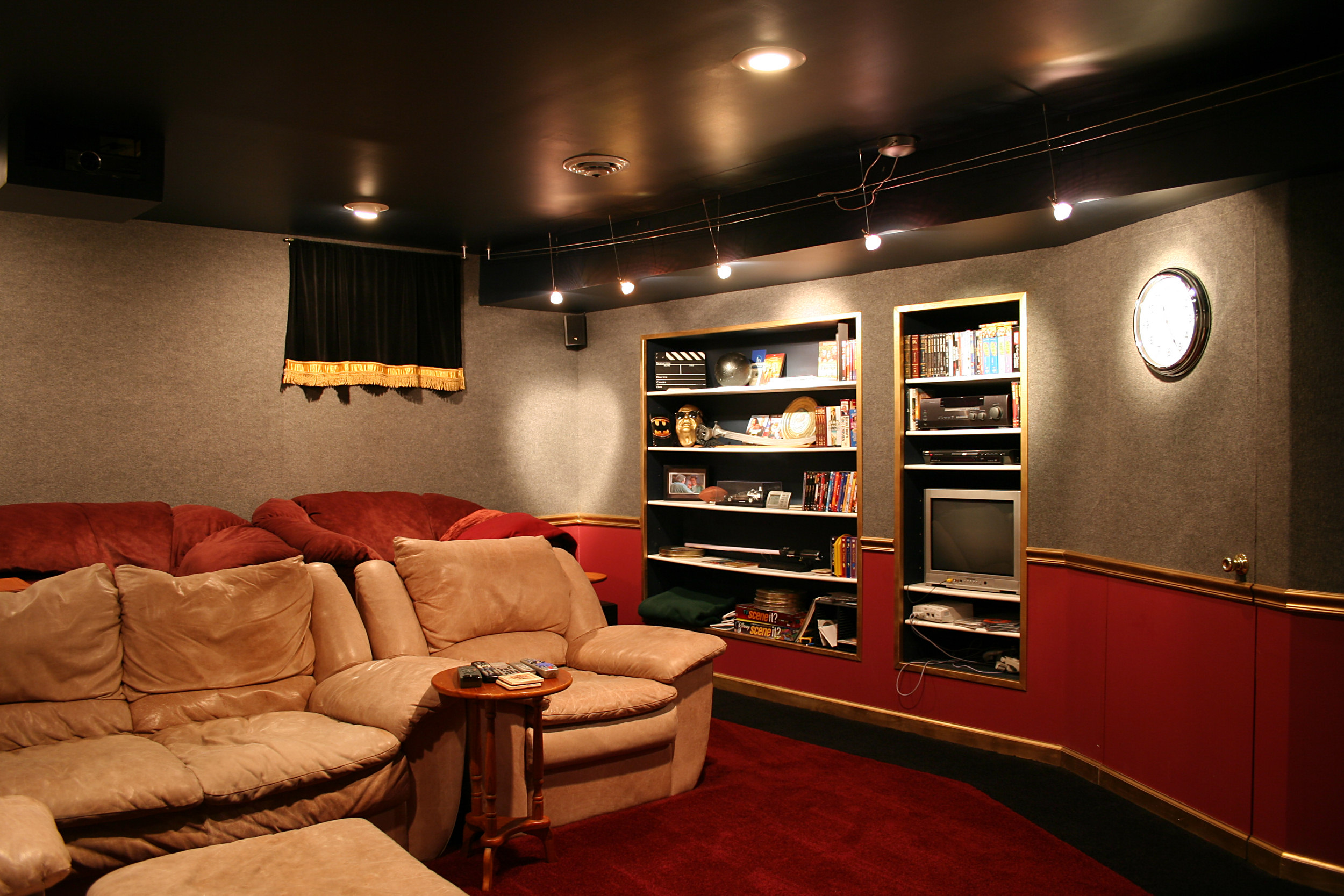
This example is of home theater screening room with video projector mounted in a box on the ceiling. Built-in shelves provide a place for movie decor, DVDs, and equipment. Note the component stack on the right, where the audio receiver, DVD player, secondary monitor, and video game system are located.

Some home cinema enthusiasts build a dedicated room in their home for the theater. These more advanced installations often include sophisticated acoustic design elements, including room-in-a-room construction that isolates sound and provides an improved listening environment and a large screen, often using a high-definition projector. These installations are often designated as screening rooms to differentiate them from simpler, less-expensive installations. In some movie enthusiasts' home cinemas, this idea can go as far as completely recreating an actual small-scale cinema, with a projector enclosed in its own projection booth, specialized furniture, curtains in front of the projection screen, movie posters, or a popcorn or vending machine with snack food and candy.

The cost of outfitting a home cinema system has dropped due to rapid advances in digital audio and video technologies bringing home theater in reach of do-it-yourselfers. As of 2016, consumer-grade A/V equipment can meet some of the standards of a small modern commercial cinema (e.g., THX sound).

=== Seating ===
Home cinema seating consists of chairs or sofas specifically designed for viewing movies in a home cinema. Some seating has cinema-style chairs, which feature a flip-up seat cushion. Other seating systems have plush leather reclining lounger types, with flip-out footrests. Available features include cup holder, storage compartments, snack trays, tactile transducers for low-frequency effects that can be felt through a chair, and electric motors to adjust the chair.

== Backyard cinema ==
It is possible for people to set up a home cinema in an outdoor area. Depending on the space available, it may simply be a temporary version with a foldable screen, a video projector and a couple of speakers, or a permanent fixture with a larger permanent screen and dedicated audio set-up mounted in a weather-proof cabinet. Some specialist outdoor home-cinema companies are now marketing packages with inflatable movie screens and purpose-built AV systems. Some people have expanded the idea and constructed mobile drive-in theaters that can play movies in public open spaces.

== History ==
=== 1920s–1940s ===
In the 1920s, the first home cinemas were made using silent 16 mm film projectors such as Kodascope and Filmo. Later, in the 1930s, 8 mm and sound 16 mm were introduced. These were rare luxuries.

=== 1950s–1970s ===
In the 1950s, home movies became more popular in the United States and elsewhere as Kodak 8 mm film (Pathé 9.5 mm in France) and camera and projector equipment became affordable. Projected with a small, portable movie projector onto a portable screen, often without sound, this system became the first practical home theater. They were generally used to show home movies of family travels and celebrations, but they also doubled as a means of showing some commercial films, or private stag films. Dedicated home cinemas were called screening rooms at the time and were outfitted with 16 mm or even 35 mm projectors for showing commercial films. These were found almost exclusively in the homes of the very wealthy, especially those in the movie industry.

Portable home cinemas improved over time with colour film, Kodak Super 8 mm film cartridges, and monaural sound but remained awkward and somewhat expensive. The rise of home video in the late 1970s almost completely killed the consumer market for 8 mm film cameras and projectors, as VCRs connected to ordinary televisions provided a simpler and more flexible substitute.

=== 1980s ===
The development of multi-channel audio systems and LaserDisc in the 1980s added new dimensions for home cinema. The first-known home cinema system was designed, built and installed by Steve J. LaFontaine as a sales tool at Kirshmans furniture store in Metairie, Louisiana in 1974. He built a special sound room that incorporated the earliest quadraphonic audio systems, and he modified Sony Trinitron televisions for projecting the image. Many systems were sold in the New Orleans area in the ensuing years before the first public demonstration of this integration occurred in 1982 at the Summer Consumer Electronics Show in Chicago, Illinois. Peter Tribeman of NAD (U.S.) organized and presented a demonstration made possible by the collaborative effort of NAD, Proton, ADS, Lucasfilm and Dolby Labs, who contributed their technologies to demonstrate what a home cinema would look and sound like.

Retailers, manufacturers, and members of the consumer electronics press experienced the combination a high-quality video source with multi-channel surround sound.

=== 1990s ===
In the early to mid-1990s, a typical home cinema would have a LaserDisc player or VHS VCR fed to a large screen: rear projection for the more-affordable setups, and LCD or CRT front-projection in the more-elaborate systems. In the late 1990s, a new wave of home-cinema interest was sparked by the development of DVD-Video, Dolby Digital and DTS 5.1-channel audio, and high-quality front video projectors that provide a cinema experience at a price that rivals a big-screen HDTV.

=== 2000s ===
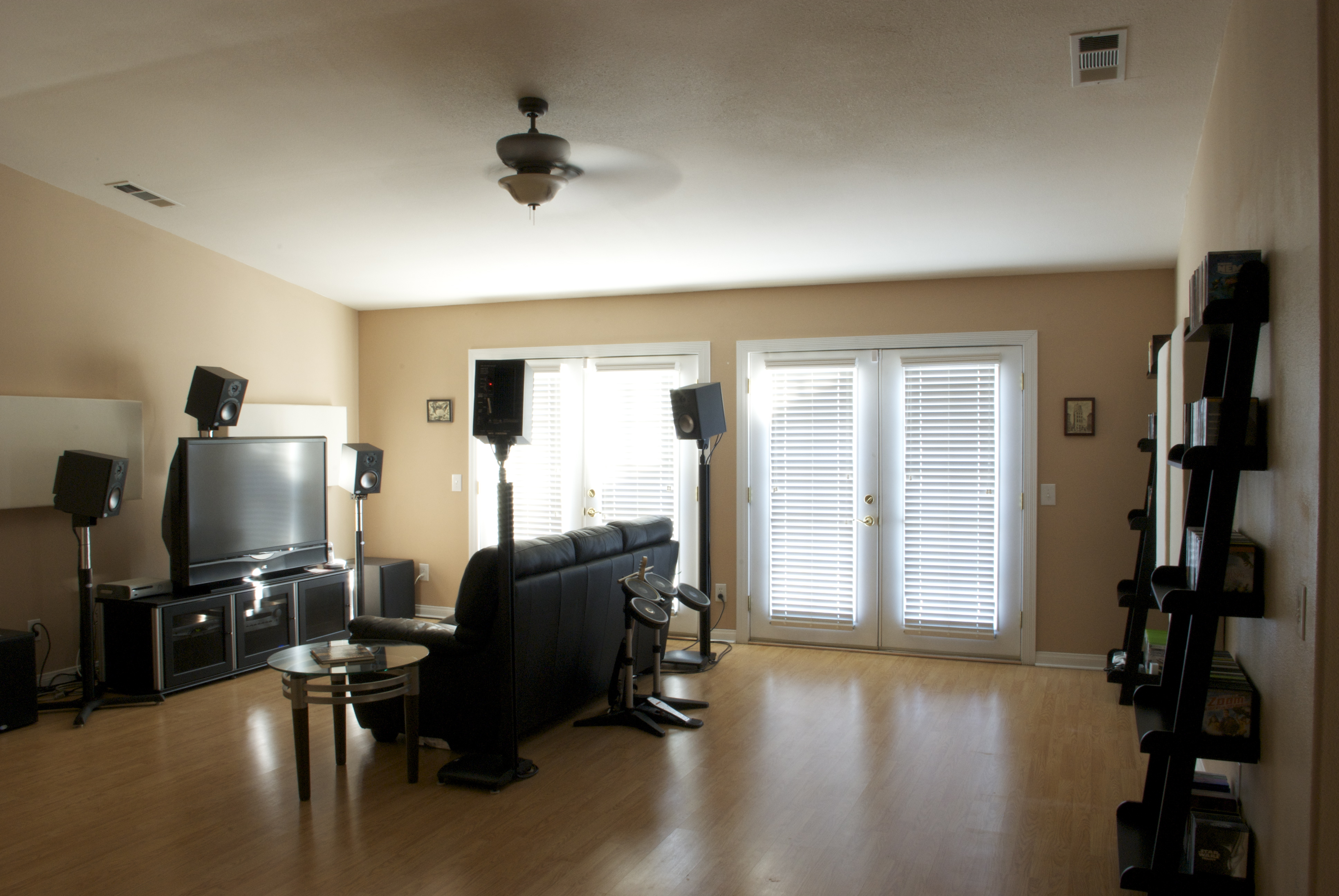
A home cinema from the late 2000s, using a rear-projection television

In the 2000s, developments such as high-definition video, Blu-ray disc (as well as the now-obsolete HD DVD format, which lost the format war to Blu-ray) and newer high-definition 3D display technologies enabled people to enjoy a cinematic feeling in their own home at a more affordable price. Newer lossless audio from Dolby Digital Plus, Dolby TrueHD, DTS-HD High-Resolution Audio and DTS-HD Master Audio and speaker systems with more audio channels (such as 6.1, 7.1, 9.1, 9.2, 10.2, and 22.2) were also introduced for a more cinematic feeling.

=== 2010s ===
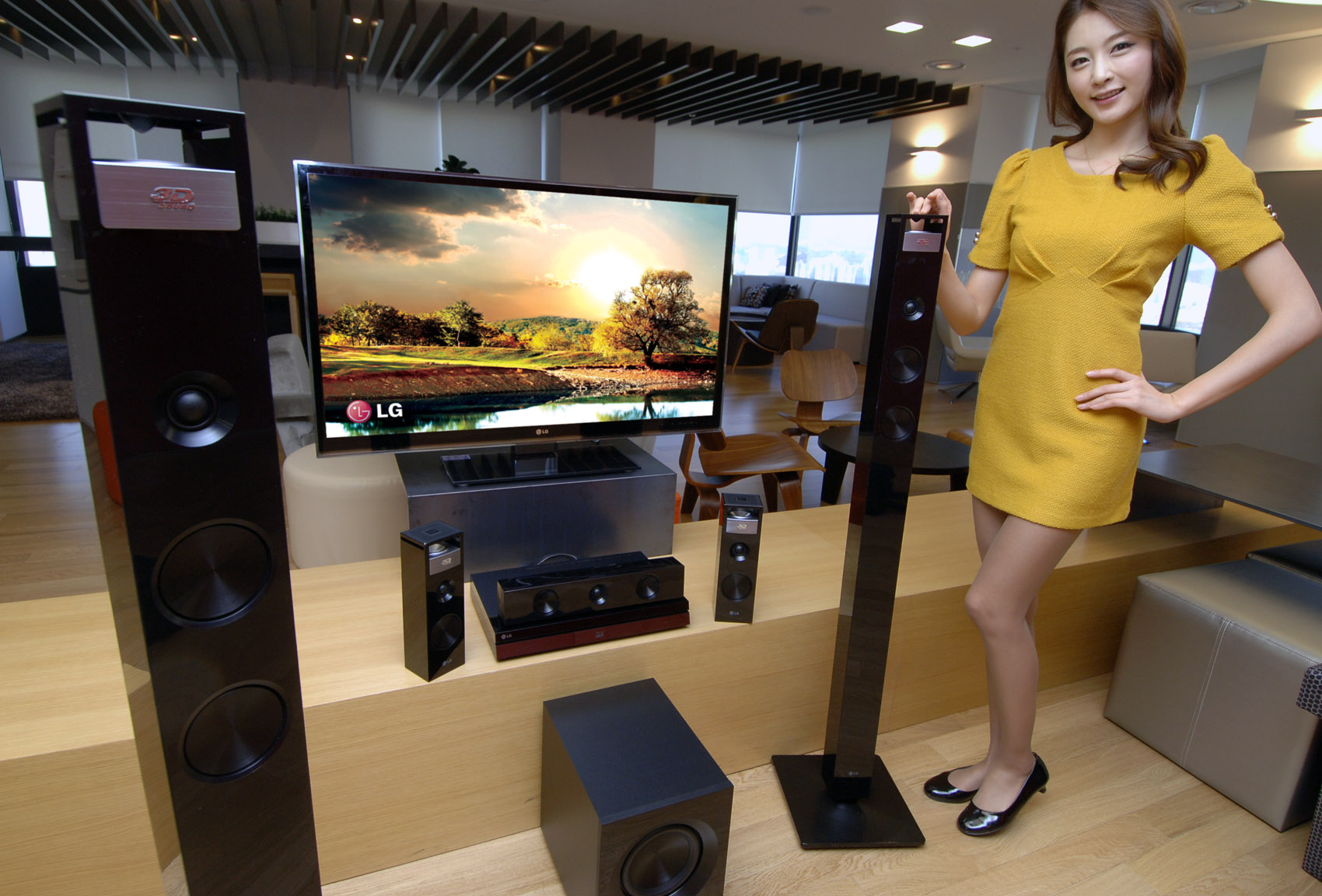
A store display for a home cinema package at a consumer electronics retailer. Some stores bundle home cinema components into a package which can be purchased for a lower cost than buying each component separately.

By the mid-2010s, the Blu-ray Disc medium had become a common home media standard, and online video streaming sources such as Netflix, Hulu and YouTube were offering a range of high-definition content, including some 4K content (although various compression technologies are applied to make this streamed content feasible). The first 4K Blu-ray discs were released in 2016. By this point, 4K TVs and computer monitors were rapidly declining in price and increasing in prevalence, despite a lack of native 4K content. While many DSP systems existed, DTS-HD Master Audio remained the studio standard for lossless surround sound encoding on Blu-ray, with five or seven native discrete channels. High-definition video projectors also continued to improve and decrease in price, relative to performance.

As a result of continuing price reductions, large (up to 80'') TVs became a financially competitive alternative to video projectors in living room or even smaller dedicated room setups. Technologies such as local dimming and the like improved the black levels of LCD screens, making them more suitable for use in a dark room. Consumer-grade OLED TVs measuring 55'' and above began to emerge in the second half of the decade. These had even better black levels.

=== 2020s ===
As of 2020, while video projectors remain the primary viable option financially speaking when screen sizes much over 80 inches (200 cm) are needed, 4K TVs meeting or exceeding 80 inches have become an option, which may offer greater visual fidelity than video projection at comparable sizes with technologies such as OLED panels, superior brightness, color consistency, performance in well-lit rooms, and overall greater ease of use.

== Entertainment equipment standards ==
Noise Criteria (NC) are noise-level guidelines applicable to cinema and home cinema. For this application, it is a measure of a room's ambient noise level at various frequencies. For example, in order for a theater to be THX-certified, it must have an ambient sound level of NC-30 or less. This helps to retain the dynamic range of the system. Some NC levels are:

- NC 40: Significant but not a dooming level of ambient noise; the highest acceptable ambient noise level. 40 decibels is the lower sound pressure level of normal talking; 60 being the highest.
- NC 30: A good NC level; necessary for THX certification in cinemas.
- NC 20: An excellent NC level; difficult to attain in large rooms and sought after for dedicated home cinema systems. For example, for a home cinema to be THX-certified, it has to have a rating of NC 22.
- NC 10: Virtually impossible noise criteria to attain; 10 decibels is associated with the sound level of calm breathing.

== See also ==
- Digital cinema
- Home theater PC
- Media server
- Over-the-top media service
