= 10-foot user interface =

Graphical user interface designed for televisions

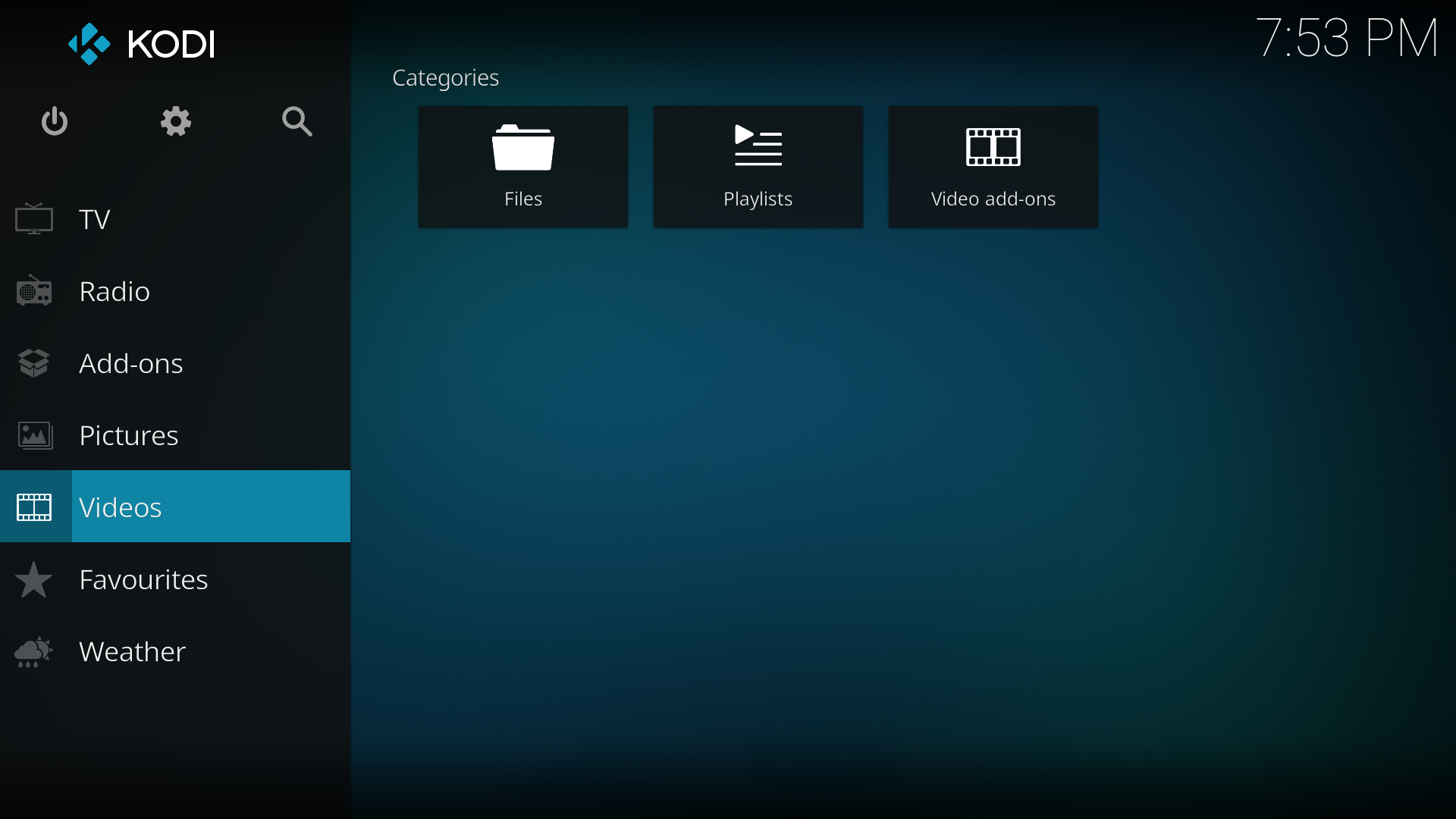
Kodi is an example of home theater PC software, which is designed to be displayed on a TV. It can be controlled using a remote, a game controller, or a keyboard.

In computing, a 10-foot user interface, also known as a 10-foot UI or three-meter user interface or UI, is a graphical user interface designed for televisions. Compared to desktop computer and smartphone user interfaces, it uses text and other interface elements that are much larger in order to accommodate a typical television viewing distance of 10 feet (3.0 meters). In reality, this distance varies greatly between households. Additionally, the limitations of a television's remote control necessitate extra user experience considerations to minimize user effort.

In the past, these types of human interaction design (HID) interfaces were driven by remote controllers primarily using infrared (IR) signals, which are increasingly replaced by other two-way radio-frequency protocol standards such as Bluetooth while maintaining the use of IR for certain wake-up situations. Voice control is also available with many devices.

== Design ==
User interface intended for a television. It can be used from different distances, some of which can be very large.

The terms ten-foot and three-meter are used to differentiate this user interface style from those used on desktop computers, which typically assume the user's eyes are only about two feet (60 cm) from the display. This difference in distance from the display has a huge impact on the interface design, requiring the use of larger text and allowing relatively few items to be shown on a television at once. The term ten-foot user interface is criticised for indicating a distance that is more symbolic than objective. In fact, a 1920×1080 pixel resolution UI has a physical size that varies with the size of the TV set. This is why, in television, distance is expressed in picture heights (H) and not in metres (or feet). Furthermore, this 10-foot distance does not correspond to the optimal viewing distance or the Lechner distance (3.2 H for 1080 HD resolution and 1.6 H for 4K UHD resolution). Nor does it represent the actual distance at which televisions are used. The actual distance is greater than 10 ft in half of all households, but above all it varies greatly between households. When designing interfaces for TV sets, it is therefore recommended to position yourself at the various distances used in real-life households.

A 10-foot UI is almost always designed to be operated by a simple hand-held remote control. Rather than the mouse or touchscreen which are commonly used with other types of user interfaces, the remote's directional pad is the primary means of navigation. This means that a 10-foot UI needs to arrange items on screen in a way that clearly shows which item would be next in each of the four directions of the directional pad – usually a grid layout. Also, without a mouse cursor, the currently-selected item must be highlighted in some way.

Ten-foot interfaces may resemble other post-WIMP systems graphically, but do not assume the use of a touch screen.

The goal of 10-foot user interface design is normally to make the user's interaction as simple and efficient as possible, trying to achieve a more laid-back and relaxed user experience with as few button presses as possible while still having an intuitive layout, in terms of accomplishing user goals—what is often called user-centered design. Good user interface design facilitates finishing the task at hand without drawing unnecessary attention to itself. Graphic design may be utilized to support its usability; however, the design process must balance technical functionality and visual elements (e.g., mental model) to create a system that is not only operational but also usable and adaptable to changing user needs.

One of the additional feature in 10-foot user interface design is also to repurpose the on-screen display (OSD) for providing a clear menu-driven interaction for users. This complements the navigation available in most handheld remote controllers. The rise of the use of voice-based input (as found in some remote controllers and smart speakers) also provides a direct control interface enhancing the user experience.

== See also ==
- Human–computer interaction
- Optimal viewing distance
- Icon design
- Smart TV
- User experience design
