= Surround sound =

System with loudspeakers that surround the listener

12.2 channel surround sound (7 front, 4 sides, 1 back, 2 bass)

Surround sound is a technique for enriching the fidelity and depth of sound reproduction by using multiple audio channels from speakers that surround the listener (surround channels). Its first application was in movie theaters. Prior to surround sound, theater sound systems commonly had three screen channels of sound that played from three loudspeakers (left, center, and right) located in front of the audience. Surround sound adds one or more channels from loudspeakers to the side or behind the listener that are able to create the sensation of sound coming from any horizontal direction (at ground level) around the listener.

The technique enhances the perception of sound spatialization by exploiting sound localization: a listener's ability to identify the location or origin of a detected sound in direction and distance. This is achieved by using multiple discrete audio channels routed to an array of loudspeakers. Surround sound typically has a listener location (sweet spot) where the audio effects work best and presents a fixed or forward perspective of the sound field to the listener at this location.

Surround sound formats vary in reproduction and recording methods, along with the number and positioning of additional channels. The most common surround sound specification, the ITU's 5.1 standard, calls for 6 speakers: center (C), in front of the listener; left (L) and right (R), at angles of 60°; left surround (LS) and right surround (RS) at angles of 100–120°; and a subwoofer, whose position is not critical.

Surround sound can benefit audio contents with large dynamic range, such as movies and games.

== Fields of application ==
Though cinema and soundtracks represent the major uses of surround techniques, its scope of application is broader than that, as surround sound permits the creation of an audio environment for all sorts of purposes. Multichannel audio techniques may be used to reproduce contents as varied as music, speech, natural or synthetic sounds for cinema, television, broadcasting, or computers. In terms of music content for example, a live performance may use multichannel techniques in the context of an open-air concert, of a musical theatre performance or for broadcasting; for a film, specific techniques are adapted to movie theater or to home (e.g. home cinema systems). The narrative space is also a content that can be enhanced through multichannel techniques. This applies mainly to cinema narratives, for example the speech of the characters of a film, but may also be applied to plays performed in a theatre, to a conference, or to integrate voice-based comments in an archeological site or monument. For example, an exhibition may be enhanced with topical ambient sound of water, birds, train or machine noise. Topical natural sounds may also be used in educational applications. Other fields of application include video game consoles, personal computers and other platforms. In such applications, the content would typically be synthetic noise produced by the computer device in interaction with its user. Significant work has also been done using surround sound for enhanced situation awareness in military and public safety applications.

== Types of media and technologies ==
Commercial surround sound media include videocassettes, DVDs, and SDTV broadcasts encoded as analog matrixed Dolby Surround, compressed Dolby Digital, and DTS, and lossless audio such as DTS-HD Master Audio and Dolby TrueHD on HDTV, Blu-ray Disc, and HD DVD, which are identical to the studio master. Other commercial formats include the competing DVD-Audio (DVD-A) and Super Audio CD (SACD) formats, and MP3 Surround. Cinema 5.1 surround formats include Dolby Digital and DTS. Sony Dynamic Digital Sound (SDDS) is an 8-channel cinema configuration that features 5 independent audio channels across the front with two independent surround channels, and a Low-frequency effects channel. Traditional 7.1 surround speaker configuration introduces two additional rear speakers to the conventional 5.1 arrangement, for a total of four surround channels and three front channels, to create a more 360° sound field.

Most surround sound recordings are created by film production companies or video game producers; however, some consumer camcorders have such capability either built-in or available separately. Surround sound technologies can also be used in music to enable new methods of artistic expression. After the failure of quadraphonic audio in the 1970s, multichannel music has slowly been reintroduced since 1999 with the help of SACD and DVD-Audio formats. Some AV receivers, stereophonic systems, and computer sound cards contain integral digital signal processors or digital audio processors to simulate surround sound from a stereophonic source (see fake stereo).

In 1967, the rock group Pink Floyd performed the first-ever surround sound concert at "Games for May", a lavish affair at London's Queen Elizabeth Hall where the band debuted its custom-made quadraphonic speaker system. The control device they had made, the Azimuth Co-ordinator, is now displayed at London's Victoria and Albert Museum, as part of their Theatre Collections gallery.

Netflix can support DRM-protected surround sound, but if the TV set or audio device does not support Dolby-based DRM, it will fall back to stereo.

== History ==
The first documented use of surround sound was in 1940, for Disney's animated film Fantasia. Walt Disney was inspired by Nikolai Rimsky-Korsakov's operatic piece Flight of the Bumblebee to have a bumblebee featured in his musical Fantasia and also sound as if it was flying in all parts of the theatre. The initial multichannel audio application was called "Fantasound," comprising three audio channels and speakers. The sound was diffused throughout the cinema, controlled by an engineer using some 54 loudspeakers. The surround sound was achieved using the sum and the difference of the phase of the sound. However, this experimental use of surround sound was excluded from the film in later showings. In 1952, surround sound successfully reappeared with the film "This is Cinerama", using discrete seven-channel sound, and the race to develop other surround sound methods took off. For the release of the 1953 20th Century Fox film The Robe, the studio felt the film needed a larger soundstage to match its wider CinemaScope presentation and released it with four-track magnetic stereo sound with left, right, center and mono surround channels.

In the 1950s, the German composer Karlheinz Stockhausen experimented with and produced ground-breaking electronic compositions such as Gesang der Jünglinge and Kontakte, the latter using fully discrete and rotating quadraphonic sounds generated with industrial electronic equipment in Herbert Eimert's studio at the Westdeutscher Rundfunk (WDR). Edgar Varese's Poème électronique, created for the Iannis Xenakis-designed Philips Pavilion at the 1958 Brussels World's Fair, also used spatial audio with 425 loudspeakers used to move sound throughout the pavilion.

In 1957, working with artist Jordan Belson, Henry Jacobs produced Vortex: Experiments in Sound and Light - a series of concerts featuring new music, including some of Jacobs' own, and that of Karlheinz Stockhausen, and many others - taking place in the Morrison Planetarium in Golden Gate Park, San Francisco. Sound designers commonly regard this as the origin of the (now standard) concept of surround sound. The program was popular, and Jacobs and Belson were invited to reproduce it at the 1958 World Expo in Brussels. There are also many other composers who created ground-breaking surround sound works in the same time period.

In 1978, a concept devised by Max Bell for Dolby Laboratories called split surround was tested with the movie Superman. This led to the 70mm stereo surround release of Apocalypse Now, which became one of the first formal releases in cinemas with three channels in the front and two in the rear. There were typically five speakers behind the screens of 70mm-capable cinemas, but only the left, center and right were used full-frequency, while center-left and center-right were only used for bass-frequencies (as it is currently common). The Apocalypse Now encoder/decoder was designed by Michael Karagosian, also for Dolby Laboratories. The surround mix was produced by an Oscar-winning crew led by Walter Murch for American Zoetrope. The format was also deployed in 1982 with the stereo surround release of Blade Runner.

The 5.1 version of surround sound originated in 1987 at the famous French Cabaret Moulin Rouge. A French engineer, Dominique Bertrand, used a mixing board specially designed in cooperation with Solid State Logic, based on the 5000 series and including six channels. Respectively: A left, B right, C center, D left rear, E right rear, F bass. The same engineer had already achieved a 3.1 system in 1974, for the International Summit of Francophone States in Dakar, Senegal.

== Creating surround sound ==
Surround sound is created in several ways. The first and simplest method is using a surround sound recording technique—capturing two distinct stereo images, one for the front and one for the back or by using a dedicated setup, e.g., an augmented Decca tree—or mixing-in surround sound for playback on an audio system using speakers encircling the listener to play audio from different directions. A second approach is processing the audio with psychoacoustic sound localization methods to simulate a two-dimensional (2-D) sound field with headphones. A third approach, based on Huygens' principle, attempts to reconstruct the recorded sound field wavefronts within the listening space; an audio hologram form. One form, wave field synthesis (WFS), produces a sound field with an even error field over the entire area. Commercial WFS systems, currently marketed by companies sonic emotion and Iosono, require many loudspeakers and significant computing power. The 4th approach is using three mics, one for front, one for side and one for rear, also called Double MS recording.

The Ambisonics form, also based on Huygens' principle, gives an exact sound reconstruction at the central point; however, it is less accurate away from the central point. There are many free and commercial software programs available for Ambisonics, which dominates most of the consumer market, especially musicians using electronic and computer music. Moreover, Ambisonics products are the standard in surround sound hardware sold by Meridian Audio. In its simplest form, Ambisonics consumes few resources, however this is not true for recent developments, such as Near Field Compensated Higher Order Ambisonics. Some years ago it was shown that, in the limit, WFS and Ambisonics converge.

Finally, surround sound can also be achieved by mastering level, from stereophonic sources as with Penteo and NUGEN Audio, which uses digital signal processing analysis of a stereo recording to parse out individual sounds to component panorama positions, then positions them accordingly, into a five-channel field. However, there are more ways to create surround sound out of stereo, for instance, with the routines based on stereophonic sound audio source input or audio source file to quadraphonic sound audio playback, where instruments were divided over 4 speakers in the studio. This way of creating surround with software or firmware routines is normally referred to as upmixing, which was particularly successful on the Sansui QSD-series decoders that had a mode where it mapped the L ↔ R stereo onto an ∩ arc.

== Standard configurations ==
There are many alternative setups available for a surround sound experience, with a 3-2 (3 front, 2 back speakers and a low-frequency effects channel) configuration (more commonly referred to as 5.1 surround) being the standard for most surround sound applications, including cinema, television and consumer applications. This is a compromise between the ideal image creation of a room and that of practicality and compatibility with two-channel stereo. Because most surround sound mixes are produced for 5.1 surround (6 channels), larger setups require matrixes or processors to feed the additional speakers.

The standard surround setup consists of three front speakers LCR (left, center and right), two surround speakers LS and RS (left and right surround respectively) and a subwoofer for the low-frequency effects (LFE) channel, which is low-pass filtered at 120 Hz. The angles between the speakers have been standardized by the ITU (International Telecommunication Union) recommendation 775 and AES (Audio Engineering Society) as follows: 60 degrees between the L and R channels (allows for two-channel stereo compatibility) with the center speaker directly in front of the listener. The Surround channels are placed 100–120 degrees from the center channel, with the subwoofer's positioning not being critical due to the low directional factor of frequencies below 120 Hz. The ITU standard also allows for additional surround speakers, which need to be distributed evenly between 60 and 150 degrees.

Surround mixes of more or fewer channels are acceptable, if they are compatible, as described by the ITU-R BS. 775-1, with 5.1 surround. The 3-1 channel setup (consisting of one monophonic surround channel) is such a case, where both LS and RS are fed by the monophonic signal at an attenuated level of -3 dB.

The function of the center channel is to anchor the signal so that any central panned images do not shift when a listener is moving or is sitting away from the sweet spot. The center channel also prevents any timbral modifications from occurring, which is typical for 2-channel stereo, due to phase differences at the two ears of a listener. The center channel is especially used in films and television, with dialogue primarily feeding the center channel. The function of the center channel can either be of a monophonic nature (as with dialogue) or it can be used in combination with the left and right channels for true three-channel stereo. Motion Pictures tend to use the center channel for monophonic purposes with stereo being reserved purely for the left and right channels. Surround microphone techniques have, however, been developed that fully use the potential of three-channel stereo.

In 5.1 surround, phantom images between the front speakers are quite accurate, with images towards the back and especially to the sides being unstable. The localization of a virtual source, based on level differences between two loudspeakers to the side of a listener, shows great inconsistency across the standardized 5.1 setup, also being largely affected by movement away from the reference position. 5.1 surround is therefore limited in its ability to convey 3D sound, making the surround channels more appropriate for ambiance or effects.)

7.1 channel surround is another setup, most commonly used in large cinemas, that is compatible with 5.1 surround, though it is not stated in the ITU standards. 7.1 channel surround adds two additional channels, center-left (CL) and center-right (CR) to the 5.1 surround setup, with the speakers situated 15 degrees off center from the listener. This convention is used to cover an increased angle between the front loudspeakers as a product of a larger screen.

== Surround microphone techniques ==
Most 2-channel stereophonic microphone techniques are compatible with a 3-channel setup (LCR), as many of these techniques already contain a center microphone or microphone pair. Microphone techniques for LCR should, however, try to obtain greater channel separation to prevent conflicting phantom images between L/C and L/R, for example. Specialised techniques have therefore been developed for 3-channel stereo. Surround microphone techniques largely depend on the setup used, therefore being biased towards the 5.1 surround setup, as this is the standard.

Surround recording techniques can be differentiated into those that use single arrays of microphones placed in close proximity and those treating front and rear channels with separate arrays. Close arrays present more accurate phantom images, whereas separate treatment of rear channels is usually used for ambiance. For accurate depiction of an acoustic environment, such as a halls, side reflections are essential. Appropriate microphone techniques should therefore be used if the room impression is important. Although the reproduction of side images is very unstable in the 5.1 surround setup, room impressions can still be accurately presented.

Some microphone techniques used for coverage of three front channels, include double-stereo techniques, INA-3 (Ideal Cardioid Arrangement), the Decca tree setup and the OCT (Optimum Cardioid Triangle). Surround techniques are largely based on 3-channel techniques with additional microphones used for the surround channels. A distinguishing factor for the pickup of the front channels in surround is that less reverberation should be picked up, as the surround microphones will be responsible for the pickup of reverberation. Cardioid, hypercardioid, or supercardioid polar patterns will therefore often replace omnidirectional polar patterns for surround recordings. To compensate for the lost low-end of directional (pressure gradient) microphones, additional omnidirectional (pressure microphones), exhibiting an extended low-end response, can be added. The microphone's output is usually low-pass filtered. A simple surround microphone configuration involves the use of a front array in combination with two backward-facing omnidirectional room microphones placed about 10–15 meters away from the front array. If echoes are notable, the front array can be delayed appropriately. Alternatively, backward-facing cardioid microphones can be placed closer to the front array for a similar reverberation pickup.

The INA-5 (Ideal Cardioid Arrangement) is a surround microphone array that uses five cardioid microphones resembling the angles of the standardized surround loudspeaker configuration defined by the ITU Rec. 775. Dimensions between the front three microphone as well as the polar patterns of the microphones can be changed for different pickup angles and ambient response. This technique therefore allows for great flexibility.

A well-established microphone array is the Fukada Tree, which is a modified variant of the Decca Tree stereo technique. The array consists of five spaced cardioid microphones, three front microphones resembling a Decca Tree and two surround microphones. Two additional omnidirectional outriggers can be added to enlarge the perceived size of the orchestra or to better integrate the front and surround channels. The L, R, LS and RS microphones should be placed in a square formation, with L/R and LS/RS angled at 45 degrees and 135 degrees from the center microphone, respectively. Spacing between these microphones should be about 1.8 meters. This square formation is responsible for the room impressions. The center channel is placed a meter in front of the L and R channels, producing a strong center image. The surround microphones are usually placed at the critical distance (where the direct and reverberant field is equal), with the full array usually situated several meters above and behind the conductor.

The NHK (Japanese broadcasting company) developed an alternative technique also involving five cardioid microphones. Here, a baffle is used for separation between the front left and right channels, which are 30 cm apart. Outrigger omnidirectional microphones, low-pass filtered at 250 Hz, are spaced 3 meters apart in line with the L and R cardioids. These compensate for the bass roll-off of the cardioid microphones and also add expansiveness. A 3-meter spaced microphone pair, situated 2–3 meters behind the front array, is used for the surround channels. The center channel is again placed slightly forward, with the L/R and LS/RS again angled at 45 and 135 degrees, respectively.

The OCT-Surround (Optimum Cardioid Triangle-Surround) microphone array is an augmented technique of the stereo OCT technique using the same front array with added surround microphones. The front array is designed for minimum crosstalk, with the front left and right microphones having supercardioid polar patterns and angled at 90 degrees relative to the center microphone. It is important that high-quality small diaphragm microphones are used for the L and R channels to reduce off-axis coloration. Equalization can also be used to flatten the response of the supercardioid microphones to signals coming in at up to about 30 degrees from the front of the array. The center channel is placed slightly forward. The surround microphones are backward-facing cardioid microphones that are placed 40 cm back from the L and R microphones. The L, R, LS and RS microphones pick up early reflections from both the sides and the back of an acoustic venue, therefore giving significant room impressions. Spacing between the L and R microphones can be varied to obtain the required stereo width.

Specialized microphone arrays have been developed to record a space's ambiance. These arrays are used in combination with suitable front arrays or can be added to above-mentioned surround techniques. The Hamasaki square (also proposed by NHK) is a well-established microphone array used for the pickup of hall ambience. Four figure-eight microphones are arranged in a square, ideally placed far away and high up in the hall. Spacing between the microphones should be between 1–3 meters. The microphones nulls (zero pickup point) are set to face the main sound source with positive polarities outward facing, therefore very effectively minimizing the direct sound pickup as well as echoes from the back of the hall The back two microphones are mixed to the surround channels, with the front two channels being mixed in combination with the front array into L and R.

Another ambient technique is the IRT (Institut für Rundfunktechnik) cross. Here, four cardioid microphones, 90 degrees relative to one another, are placed in a square formation, separated by 21–25 cm. The front two microphones should be positioned 45 degrees off axis from the sound source. This technique therefore, resembles back-to-back near-coincident stereo pairs. The microphone outputs are fed to the L, R and LS, RS channels. The disadvantage of this approach is that direct sound pickup is quite significant.

Many recordings do not require pickup of side reflections. For Live Pop music concerts, a more appropriate array for the pickup of ambiance is the cardioid trapezium. All four cardioid microphones are backward facing and angled at 60 degrees from one another, therefore similar to a semi-circle. This is effective for the pickup of the audience and ambiance.

All the above-mentioned microphone arrays take up considerable space, making them quite ineffective for field recordings. In this respect, the double mid-side (MS) technique is quite advantageous. This array uses back-to-back cardioid microphones, one facing forward, the other backward, combined with either one or two figure-eight microphones. Different channels are obtained by the sum and difference of the figure-eight and cardioid patterns. When using only one figure-eight microphone, the double MS technique is extremely compact and therefore also perfectly compatible with monophonic playback. This technique also allows for postproduction changes of the pickup angle.

== Bass management ==
Surround replay systems may make use of bass management, the fundamental principle of which is that bass content in the incoming signal, irrespective of channel, should be directed only to loudspeakers capable of handling it, whether the latter are the main system loudspeakers or one or more special low-frequency speakers called subwoofers.

There is a notation difference before and after the bass management system. Before the bass management system, there is an LFE channel. After the bass management system, there is a subwoofer signal. A common misunderstanding is the belief that the LFE channel is the subwoofer channel. The bass management system may direct bass to one or more subwoofers (if present) from any channel, not just from the LFE channel. Also, if there is no subwoofer speaker present, then the bass management system can direct the LFE channel to one or more of the main speakers.

== Low frequency effects channel ==
Because the LFE channel requires only a fraction of the bandwidth of the other audio channels, it is referred to as the .1 channel; for example 5.1 or 7.1.

The LFE channel is a source of some confusion in surround sound. It was originally developed to carry extremely low sub-bass cinematic sound effects (e.g., the loud rumble of thunder or explosions) on their own channel. This allowed theaters to control the volume of these effects to suit the particular cinema's acoustic environment and sound reproduction system. Independent control of the sub-bass effects also reduced the problem of intermodulation distortion in analog movie sound reproduction.

In the original movie theater implementation, the LFE was a separate channel fed to one or more subwoofers. Home replay systems, however, may not have a separate subwoofer, so modern home surround decoders and systems often include a bass management system that allows bass on any channel (main or LFE) to be fed only to the loudspeakers that can handle low-frequency signals. The salient point here is that the LFE channel is not the subwoofer channel; there may be no subwoofer and, if there is, it may be handling a good deal more than effects.

Some record labels such as Telarc and Chesky have argued that LFE channels are not needed in a modern digital multichannel entertainment system. They argue that, given loudspeakers that have low-frequency response to 30 Hz, all available channels have a full-frequency range and, as such, there is no need for an LFE in surround music production, because all the frequencies are available in all the main channels. These labels sometimes use the LFE channel to carry a height channel. The label BIS Records generally uses a 5.0 channel mix.

== Channel notation ==
Channel notation indicates the number of discrete channels encoded in the audio signal, not necessarily the number of channels reproduced for playback. The number of playback channels can be increased by using matrix decoding. The number of playback channels may also differ from the number of speakers used to reproduce them if one or more channels drive a group of speakers. Notation represents the number of channels, not the number of speakers.

The first digit in 5.1 is the number of full-range channels. The .1 reflects the limited frequency range of the LFE channel.

For example, two stereo speakers with no LFE channel = 2.0
5 full-range channels + 1 LFE channel = 5.1

An alternative notation shows the number of full-range channels in front of the listener, separated by a slash from the number of full-range channels beside or behind the listener, with a decimal point marking the number of limited-range LFE channels.

E.g. 3 front channels + 2 side channels + an LFE channel = 3/2.1

The notation can be expanded to include Matrix Decoders. Dolby Digital EX, for example, has a sixth full-range channel incorporated into the two rear channels with a matrix. This is expressed:

3 front channels + 2 rear channels + 3 channels reproduced in the rear in total + 1 LFE channel = 3/2:3.1

The term stereo, although popularised in reference to two-channel audio, historically also referred to surround sound, as it strictly means solid (three-dimensional) sound. However, this is no longer common usage, and stereo sound almost exclusively means two channels, left and right.

=== Channel identification ===
In accordance with ANSI/CEA-863-A

ANSI/CEA-863-A identification for surround sound channels
Zero-based channel index			Channel name	Color-coding on commercial receiver and cabling
MP3/WAV/FLAC	DTS/AAC	Vorbis/Opus	Channel name	Color-coding on commercial receiver and cabling
0	1	0	Front left	White
1	2	2	Front right	Red
2	0	1	Center	Green
3	5	7	Subwoofer	Purple
4	3	3	Side left	Blue
5	4	4	Side right	Grey
6	6	5	Rear left	Brown
7	7	6	Rear right	Khaki

Diagram
Front left	Center	Front right
Side left		Side right
Rear left		Rear right
Subwoofer

Height channels
Index	Channel name	Color-coding on commercial receiver and cabling
8	Left height 1	Yellow
9	Right height 1	Orange
10	Left height 2	Pink
11	Right height 2	Magenta

=== Sonic Whole Overhead Sound ===
In 2002, Dolby premiered a master of We Were Soldiers which featured a Sonic Whole Overhead Sound soundtrack. This mix included a new ceiling-mounted height channel.

=== Ambisonics ===
Ambisonics is a recording and playback technique using multichannel mixing that can be used live or in the studio and which recreates the sound field as it existed in the space, in contrast to traditional surround systems, which can only create the illusion of the sound field if the listener is located in a very narrow sweet spot between speakers. Any number of speakers in any physical arrangement can be used to recreate a sound field. With 6 or more speakers arranged around a listener, a 3-dimensional ("periphonic", or full-sphere) sound field can be presented. Ambisonics was invented by Michael Gerzon.

=== Binaural recording ===
Binaural recording is a method of recording sound that uses two microphones, arranged with the intent to create the 3-D stereo experience of being present in the room with the performers or instruments. The idea of a three dimensional or internal form of sound has developed into technology for stethoscopes, creating in-head acoustics and IMAX movies, creating a three-dimensional acoustic experience.

=== Panor-Ambiophonic (PanAmbio) 4.0/4.1 ===
PanAmbio combines a stereo dipole and crosstalk cancellation in front and a second set behind the listener (total of four speakers) for 360° 2D surround reproduction. Four-channel recordings, especially those containing binaural cues, create speaker-binaural surround sound. 5.1 channel recordings, including movie DVDs, are compatible by mixing C-channel content to the front speaker pair. 6.1 can be played by mixing SC to the back pair.

=== Standard speaker channels ===
Several speaker configurations are commonly used for consumer equipment. The order and identifiers are those specified for the channel mask in the standard uncompressed WAV file format (which contains a raw multichannel PCM stream) and are used according to the same specification for most PC connectible digital sound hardware and PC operating systems capable of handling multiple channels.

Standard speaker channels in Microsoft Windows WDM Audio driver model
Channel name	ID	Identifier	Index	Flag
Front Left	FL	SPEAKER_FRONT_LEFT	0	0x00000001
Front Right	FR	SPEAKER_FRONT_RIGHT	1	0x00000002
Front Center	FC	SPEAKER_FRONT_CENTER	2	0x00000004
Low Frequency	LFE	SPEAKER_LOW_FREQUENCY	3	0x00000008
Back Left	BL	SPEAKER_BACK_LEFT	4	0x00000010
Back Right	BR	SPEAKER_BACK_RIGHT	5	0x00000020
Front Left of Center	FLC	SPEAKER_FRONT_LEFT_OF_CENTER	6	0x00000040
Front Right of Center	FRC	SPEAKER_FRONT_RIGHT_OF_CENTER	7	0x00000080
Back Center	BC	SPEAKER_BACK_CENTER	8	0x00000100
Side Left	SL	SPEAKER_SIDE_LEFT	9	0x00000200
Side Right	SR	SPEAKER_SIDE_RIGHT	10	0x00000400
Top Center	TC	SPEAKER_TOP_CENTER	11	0x00000800
Front Left Height	TFL	SPEAKER_TOP_FRONT_LEFT	12	0x00001000
Front Center Height	TFC	SPEAKER_TOP_FRONT_CENTER	13	0x00002000
Front Right Height	TFR	SPEAKER_TOP_FRONT_RIGHT	14	0x00004000
Rear Left Height	TBL	SPEAKER_TOP_BACK_LEFT	15	0x00008000
Rear Center Height	TBC	SPEAKER_TOP_BACK_CENTER	16	0x00010000
Rear Right Height	TBR	SPEAKER_TOP_BACK_RIGHT	17	0x00020000

While it is possible to build any speaker configuration, there is little commercial movie or music content for alternative speaker configurations. However, source channels can be remixed for the speaker channels using a matrix table specifying how much of each content channel is played through each speaker channel.

Most channel configurations may include an LFE channel (the channel played through the subwoofer.) This makes the configuration .1 instead of .0. Most modern multichannel mixes contain one LFE; some use two.

Standard speaker channel layouts
Icon	System	Channels	LFE	Front				Sides	Back		
Icon	System	Channels	LFE	FL+FR	FC	FLC+FRC	TFL+TFR	SL+SR	BL+BR	BC	TBL+TBR
resize	Mono (Note: For historical reasons, when using (1.0) mono sound, often in technical implementations the first (left) channel is used, instead of the center speaker channel. In many other cases, when playing back multichannel content on a device with a mono speaker configuration, all channels are downmixed into one channel. The way standard mono and stereo plugs used for common audio devices are designed ensures this as well.)	1.0	No	No	Yes	No	No	No	No	No	No
resize	Stereo (Note: Stereo (2.0) is still the most common format for music, as most computers, television sets and portable audio players only feature two speakers, and the Red Book Audio CD standard used for retail distribution of music only allows for two channels. A 2.1 speaker set generally does not have a separate physical channel for the low-frequency effects, as the speaker set downmixes the low-frequency components of the two stereo channels into one channel for the subwoofer.)	2.0	2.1	Yes	No	No	No	No	No	No	No
resize	Triple	3.0	3.1	Yes	Yes	No	No	No	No	No	No
	Atmos	3.1.2	Yes	Yes	Yes	No	Yes	No	No	No	No
resize	Triple	3.0	3.1	Yes	No	No	No	No	No	Yes	No
resize	Quad	4.0	4.1	Yes	No	No	No	No	Yes	No	No
resize	Quad side	4.0	4.1	Yes	No	No	No	Yes	No	No	No
resize	Quad center	4.0	4.1	Yes	Yes	No	No	No	No	Yes	No
resize	Front	5.0	5.1	Yes	Yes	No	No	No	Yes	No	No
resize	Side	5.0	5.1	Yes	Yes	No	No	Yes	No	No	No
resize	Atmos	5.1.4	Yes	Yes	Yes	No	Yes	No	Yes	No	Yes
resize	Hexagonal (Back)	6.0	6.1	Yes	Yes	No	No	No	Yes	Yes	No
	Front	6.0	6.1	Yes	Yes	Yes	No	No	No	Yes	No
resize	Side	6.0	6.1	Yes	Yes	No	No	Yes	No	Yes	No
resize	Wide	7.1	Yes	Yes	Yes	Yes	No	No	Yes	No	No
resize	Side	7.0	7.1	Yes	Yes	Yes	No	Yes	No	No	No
resize	Surround	7.0	7.1	Yes	Yes	No	No	Yes	Yes	No	No
resize	Atmos	7.1.4	Yes	Yes	Yes	No	Yes	Yes	Yes	No	Yes
resize	Octagonal	8.0	8.1	Yes	Yes	No	No	Yes	Yes	Yes	No
resize	Surround	9.0	9.1	Yes	Yes	No	Yes	Yes	Yes	No	No
	Surround	11.0	11.1	Yes	Yes	Yes	Yes	Yes	Yes	No	No
resize	Atmos	11.1.4	Yes	Yes	Yes	Yes	No	Two per side	Two per side	Yes	Yes
	Atmos	11.1.6	Yes	Yes	Yes	Yes	Yes	Two per side	Two per side	Yes	Yes

=== 7.1 surround sound ===
7.1 surround sound is a popular format in theaters and home cinema, including Blu-rays with Dolby and DTS being major players.

=== 5.1.2/5.1.4/7.1.2/7.1.4 immersive sound ===
7.1.2 and 7.1.4 immersive sound, along with 5.1.2 and 5.1.4 formats, add either 2 or 4 overhead speakers (height channels) to enable sound objects and special effect sounds to be panned overhead for the listener. Introduced for theatrical film releases in 2012 by Dolby Laboratories under the trademark name Dolby Atmos.

Dolby Atmos (and other Microsoft Spatial Sound engines; see AudioObjectType in SpatialAudioClient.h) additionally support a virtual 8.1.4.4 configuration, to be rendered by a HRTF. The configuration adds to 7.1.4 with a center speaker behind the listener and 4 speakers below.

=== 10.2 surround sound ===
10.2 is the surround sound format developed by THX creator Tomlinson Holman of TMH Labs and University of Southern California (schools of Cinema/Television and Engineering). Developed along with Chris Kyriakakis of the USC Viterbi School of Engineering, 10.2 refers to the format's promotional slogan: "Twice as good as 5.1". Advocates of 10.2 argue that it is the audio equivalent of IMAX.

=== 11.1 surround sound ===
11.1 sound is supported by BARCO with installations in theaters worldwide.

=== 22.2 surround sound ===
22.2 is the surround sound component of Ultra High Definition Television, developed by NHK Science & Technical Research Laboratories. As its name suggests, it uses 24 speakers. These are arranged in three layers: A middle layer of ten speakers, an upper layer of nine speakers, and a lower layer of three speakers and two sub-woofers. The system was demonstrated at Expo 2005, Aichi, Japan, the NAB Shows 2006 and 2009, Las Vegas, and the IBC trade shows 2006 and 2008, Amsterdam, Netherlands.

== See also ==
- 3D audio effect
- Binaural recording
- Dolby Surround
- Duophonic
- Four-channel Compact Disc Digital Audio
- Holophonics
- MPEG Surround
- Precedence effect
- Soundfield microphone
- Virtual surround
