= 10.2 surround sound =

Sound system

10.2 is the surround sound format developed by THX creator Tomlinson Holman of TMH Labs and the University of Southern California (schools of Cinematic Arts and Engineering). Developed along with Chris Kyriakakis of the USC Viterbi School of Engineering, 10.2 refers to the format's slogan: "Twice as good as 5.1". However, there actually may be 14 discrete channels if the left and right point surround channels are included. He states that 5.1, a name which he himself came up with in 1987 was chosen as it was "the minimum number of channels necessary to give a sense of spaciousness". Holman and others state that higher sampling rates, which is a recent trend in digital recording, does not have a significant perceivable effect and that the next frontier in sound engineering is to increase the number of discrete channels to meet human spatial sound perception. As of 2015, several decoding, UHD, or virtual expansion processors have approached numbers as great or greater than 10.2.

== Channel configurations ==
10.2 surround sound would add four more channels to the front listening area and only one surround channel. This is because human spatial perception of sound is much more precise in the front than in the back. In addition it adds depth to the sound field with two of the front channels being height channels, located above the listening area at 45 degrees relative to the listener. Lack of vertical information has long been considered one of the largest obstacles to realistic sound reproduction. Existing systems such as Dolby Pro Logic IIz simulate this with matrixed height channels, which are derived from ambient sounds from the left and right channels.

The ".2" in 10.2 refers to the fact that an additional Low Frequency Effects channel is added, not just a second subwoofer, to enhance the sense of envelopment. All bass from the left channels are directed to a left LFE channel while right channel bass is directed to the right LFE channel.

=== 10.2 ===
The 12 channels of 10.2:

- Seven front channels: Left Wide, Left Height, Left, Center, Right, Right Height, Right Wide
- Three surround channels: Left Surround, Back Surround, Right Surround
- Two LFE channels: LFE Left and LFE Right

10.2 may also augment the LS (left surround) and RS (right surround) channels by two point surround channels that can better manipulate sound—allowing the mixer to shift sounds in a distinct 360° circle around the movie watcher. This would actually make it 12.2

=== 12.2 ===
The only addition with 12.2 from 10.2 are the "point surround" or "diffuse surround" channels. These would be placed at the same angles as the standard surround speakers at +/-120 degrees, but would be diffuse radiators using dipole speakers. They would emit sound to reflect off the walls before arriving at the listening area. The 14 discrete channels are:

Setup with point surround channels

- Five front speakers: Left Wide, Left, Center, Right and Right Wide
- Five surround channels: Left Surround Diffuse, Left Surround Direct, Back Surround, Right Surround Diffuse and Right Surround Direct
- Two LFE channels: LFE Left, LFE Right
- Two Height channels: Left Height, Right Height

The .2 of the 10.2 refers to the addition of a second subwoofer. The system is bass managed such that all the speakers on the left side use the left sub and all the speakers on the right use the right sub. The Center and Back Surround speakers are split among the two subs. The two subs also serve as two discrete LFE (Low Frequency Effects) channels.

== Installations ==
A 10.2 surround sound system was demonstrated at Audyssey in Los Angeles and at Bjorn's Audio Video in San Antonio, Texas.

New York University claims to have two 10.2 surround sound systems set up in their new $6.5 million music technology complex at Steinhardt School. One in a recording studio and one in a screening room. Products are already being sold to accommodate 10.2 surround systems such as in-wall speaker jacks.

Currently, there is only a standard for 5.1 surround setups. 6.1 and 7.1 have no real standard, and add channels to the rear instead of the front, which can only be conceived as a marketing tool as sonically the front needs more channels. Audyssey has stated that one fear of marketing 10.2 systems will be that ironically quality might be decreased instead of increased. This is because marketers will push to keep prices relatively the same and to do that with four additional speakers and two subwoofers will almost certainly cost quality.

== Media ==
There is currently only one film available which uses this format, a 30-minute short called Seven Swans. The other 10.2 mixes were created by Holman and others at the demonstrations.

There are some receivers that claim to be "10.2 channels" such as the Pioneer Elite SC-09TX but just have multiple 6, 7, or 8 channel decoders.
