= Audyssey Laboratories =

American theater company

Audyssey Laboratories, Inc.
- Type: Private
- Industry: Home Theater, Automotive, Professional Audio
- Founded: 2002; 24 years ago
- Headquarters: Los Angeles, California
- Key people: Chris Kyriakakis, Tomlinson Holman, Sunil Bharitkar, Philip Hilmes
- Products: MultEQ, Dynamic Volume, Dynamic EQ, Dynamic Surround Expansion, Sound Equalizer, Sub Equalizer

Audyssey Laboratories, Inc. (Audyssey) is an American-based company specializing in technologies that address acoustical problems in sound reproduction systems used in homes, cars, studios, and movie theaters.

== History ==
Audyssey was created in 2002 as a spin-off from the USC Integrated Media Systems Center, the National Science Foundation engineering research center at the University of Southern California. It was founded by Prof. Chris Kyriakakis from the USC Viterbi School of Engineering and Prof. Tomlinson Holman from the USC School of Cinematic Arts along with two former USC students and researchers, Dr. Sunil Bharitkar and Philip Hilmes.

The first Audyssey technology was released in home theater receivers in 2004. It addressed the negative effects of room acoustics on sound reproduction. Since then, Audyssey has delivered several audio technologies that seek to overcome acoustical limitations in audio systems and better match human perception. Since 2004 Audyssey technologies have appeared in numerous consumer, professional, and automotive products.

== Technologies ==
=== Room Acoustics Correction – MultEQ and EQ ===
Audyssey MultEQ: A technology that allows consumers and professionals to fix the acoustical problems in rooms that arise from the interaction of sound from the loudspeakers with the surfaces in the room. MultEQ uses acoustical measurements in the time domain taken by a microphone around the listening area and combines this information to evaluate the acoustical problems that cause audible distortions in the frequency response. MultEQ then creates a room equalization filter for each speaker and subwoofer in the system to correct these problems. Audyssey EQ is a direct extension of MultEQ for products that come with attached loudspeakers such as televisions and home theater in a box systems.

=== Loudness Compensation – Dynamic EQ ===
Audyssey Dynamic EQ: A technology that solves the problem of deteriorating sound quality as the playback volume is decreased. Dynamic EQ combines information from incoming source levels and actual output sound levels in the room or car to make moment-by-moment adjustments that compensate for the changes in human hearing at different listening levels.

=== Volume Leveling – Dynamic Volume ===
Audyssey Dynamic Volume: A technology that solves the problem of constantly varying volume across program material. It monitors the volume in real time and maintains the desired listening level for all content while optimizing the dynamic range.

=== Surround Envelopment – Audyssey DSX ===
Audyssey Dynamic Surround Expansion (DSX): A scalable technology that expands the soundstage of surround sound content by adding width and height loudspeaker channels. Audyssey DSX then synthesizes the necessary content for these channels to reproduce the necessary acoustical and perceptual cues that enhance soundstage rendering for surround sound.

Audyssey has an 11.2 surround sound system using DSX which adds two height and two wide left and right channels to a traditional 7.1 mix.

== See also ==
- Dolby Labs Volume leveling competitor
- DRC: Digital Room Correction Free room correction software. The documentation is very good and contains a lot of background information, including real measured results
- THX Loudness compensation competitor
- SRS Labs Surround sound
- Trinnov Audio Loudspeaker optimization
- Dirac Research High-end digital sound optimization, room correction and sound field synthesis
