= Display size =

Physical size of pictures and videos

Comparison of screen sizes by width, height, diagonal, area, and aspect ratio

On 2D displays, such as computer monitors and TVs, display size or viewable image size (VIS) refers to the physical size of the area where pictures and videos are displayed. The size of a screen is usually described by the length of its diagonal, which is the distance between opposite corners, typically measured in inches. It is also sometimes called the physical image size to distinguish it from the "logical image size", which describes a screen's display resolution and is measured in pixels.

== History ==
The method of measuring screen size by its diagonal was inherited from the first generation of televisions, which used circular cathode ray tube displays. Being circular, the external diameter of the bulb was used to describe their size. Since these circular tubes displayed rectangular images, the diagonal measurement of the visible rectangle was smaller than the diameter of the tube due to the thickness of the glass surrounding the phosphor screen, which was hidden from the viewer by the casing and bezel. This method continued even when cathode ray tubes were manufactured as rounded rectangles. It had the advantage of being a single number specifying the size and was not confusing when the aspect ratio was universally 4:3. In the US, when virtually all TV tubes were 4:3, the size of the screen was given as the true screen diagonal with a ‘V’ following it (this was a requirement in the US market, but not elsewhere). In virtually all other markets, the size of the outer diameter of the tube was given. A 27V in the US could be a 28" elsewhere. However, the V terminology was frequently dropped in US advertising referring to a 27V as a 27". This was not misleading for the consumer as the seller had to give the actual screen size by law. Flat panel displays by contrast use the diagonal of their visible display size, thus the size is the actual size presented to the viewer in all markets. This means that a similarly specified size of display will be larger as a flat panel display compared with a cathode ray tube display.

When the common aspect ratio shifted from 4:3 to 16:9, the new widescreens were labeled with a W in the US. A screen that is about the same height as a 27V would be a 32W. Vizio and other US TV manufacturers have introduced even wider screens with a 21:9 aspect ratio to match aspect ratios used in cinemas. To gauge the relative sizes of these new screens, the screen aspect must be considered. In a commercial market where multiple aspect ratios are being sold, it will always take two numbers to describe the screen size, some combination of diagonal, aspect ratio, height or width.

Set sizes are frequently given as a ‘class’ as screens from different manufacturers will have slight variances in size. However, the "class" should be within 1/2" of the actual size. The reasons for the different sizes within a class stem from variances in the manufacturers' equipment. As manufacturers move from one size to another, newer larger sizes must fit on the same size glass, though with fewer displays being cut from it. Some sizes fit well and maximize glass utilization, while other sizes fit more poorly and waste glass. For example, in some cases, increasing the screen size by even 0.1” can cause an LCD manufacturer to go from 12 screens fitting on their glass sheet to 9.

== Optimal screen size and viewing distance ==
The resolution of the human eye (with 20/20 vision) is about one minute of arc. For full HDTV resolution, this one minute of arc implies that the TV watcher should sit 3.2 times the height of the screen away (optimal viewing distance). At this distance, the individual pixels cannot be resolved while simultaneously maximizing the viewing area. For more TV resolutions, see "The optimal viewing distance".

The TV image is composed of many lines of pixels. Ideally, the TV watcher sits far enough away from the screen that the individual lines merge into one solid image. The watcher may sit even further away and still see a good picture, but it will occupy a smaller portion of their visual field.

== Display sizes of common handheld devices, computer monitors and TVs ==
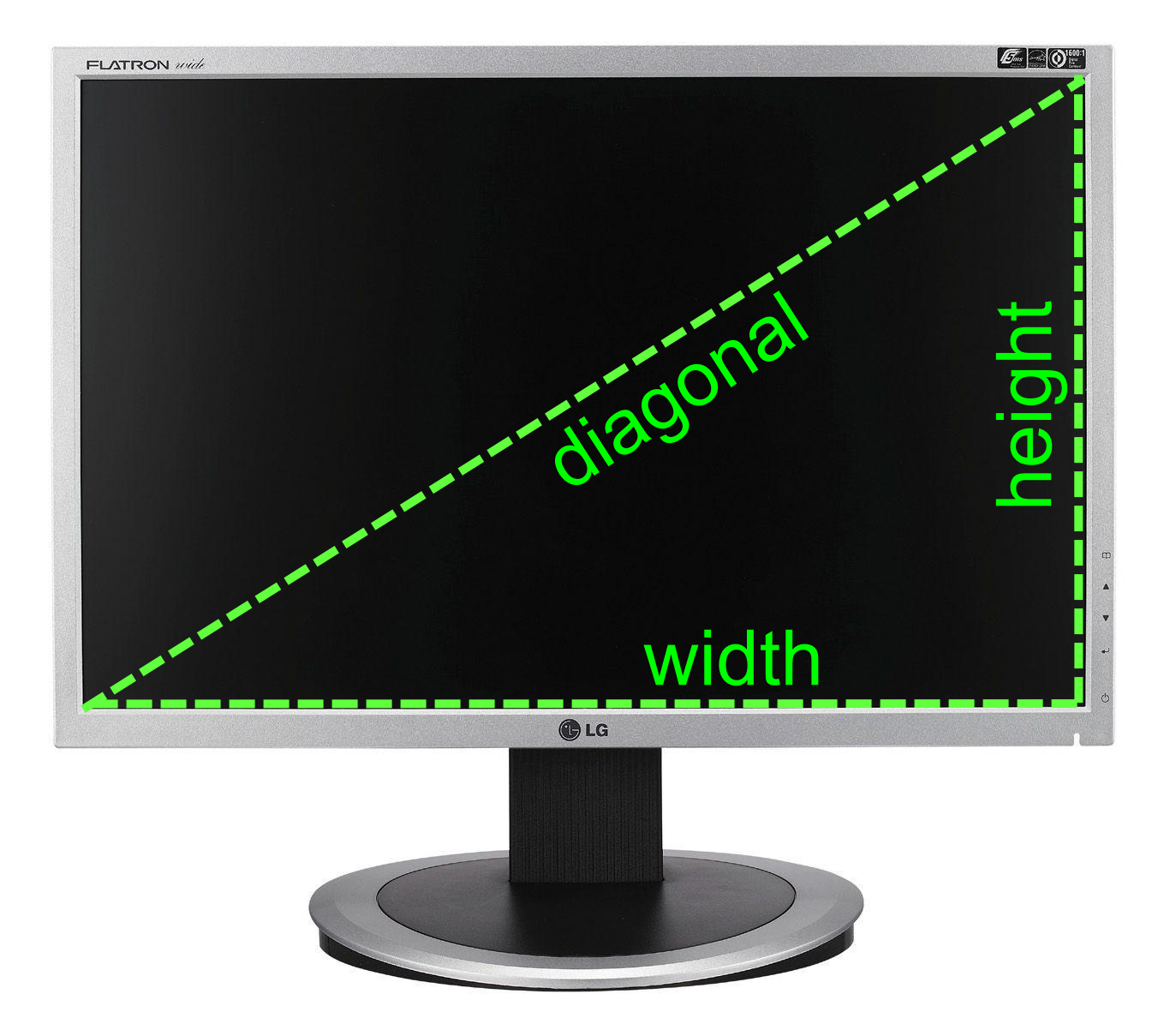

Common screen dimensions are listed in the table below (the most common diagonal dimensions in inches as of 2020 are bolded). If the display is not listed, then the following equations can be used. Note that D is the diagonal (in centimeters or inches), W is the width (in pixels), and H is the height (in pixels).

**Diagonal**		5:4						**Diagonal**		4:3						**Diagonal**		3:2 (15:10)						**Diagonal**		8:5 (16:10)						**Diagonal**		5:3 (15:9)						**Diagonal**		16:9 (4²:3²)						**Diagonal**		64:27 (4³:3³ ≈ 21:9)					
**d (cm)**	**d (in)**	**w (cm)**	**w (in)**	**h (cm)**	**h (in)**	**a (cm^{2})**	**a (in^{2})**	**d (cm)**	**d (in)**	**w (cm)**	**w (in)**	**h (cm)**	**h (in)**	**a (cm^{2})**	**a (in^{2})**	**d (cm)**	**d (in)**	**w (cm)**	**w (in)**	**h (cm)**	**h (in)**	**a (cm^{2})**	**a (in^{2})**	**d (cm)**	**d (in)**	**w (cm)**	**w (in)**	**h (cm)**	**h (in)**	**a (cm^{2})**	**a (in^{2})**	**d (cm)**	**d (in)**	**w (cm)**	**w (in)**	**h (cm)**	**h (in)**	**a (cm^{2})**	**a (in^{2})**	**d (cm)**	**d (in)**	**w (cm)**	**w (in)**	**h (cm)**	**h (in)**	**a (cm^{2})**	**a (in^{2})**	**d (cm)**	**d (in)**	**w (cm)**	**w (in)**	**h (cm)**	**h (in)**	**a (cm^{2})**	**a (in^{2})**
9	3.5	7	2.76	6	2.36	39	15.35	9	3.5	7	2.76	5	1.97	38	14.96	9	3.5	7	2.76	5	1.97	36	14.17	9	3.5	8	3.15	5	1.97	36	14.17	9	3.5	8	3.15	5	1.97	35	13.78	9	3.5	8	3.15	4	1.57	34	13.39	9	3.5	8	3.15	3	1.18	28	11.02
9	3.7	7	2.76	6	2.36	43	16.93	9	3.7	8	3.15	6	2.36	42	16.54	9	3.7	8	3.15	5	1.97	41	16.14	9	3.7	8	3.15	5	1.97	40	15.75	9	3.7	8	3.15	5	1.97	39	15.35	9	3.7	8	3.15	5	1.97	38	14.96	9	3.7	9	3.54	4	1.57	32	12.60
10	4	8	3.15	6	2.36	50	19.69	10	4	8	3.15	6	2.36	50	19.69	10	4	8	3.15	6	2.36	48	18.90	10	4	9	3.54	5	1.97	46	18.11	10	4	9	3.54	5	1.97	46	18.11	10	4	9	3.54	5	1.97	44	17.32	10	4	9	3.54	4	1.57	37	14.57
11	4.3	9	3.54	7	2.76	58	22.83	11	4.3	9	3.54	7	2.76	57	22.44	11	4.3	9	3.54	6	2.36	55	21.65	11	4.3	9	3.54	6	2.36	54	21.26	11	4.3	9	3.54	6	2.36	53	20.87	11	4.3	10	3.94	5	1.97	51	20.08	11	4.3	10	3.94	4	1.57	43	16.93
13	**5**	10	3.94	8	3.15	79	31.10	13	5	10	3.94	8	3.15	77	30.31	13	5	11	4.33	7	2.76	74	29.13	13	5	11	4.33	7	2.76	72	28.35	13	5	11	4.33	7	2.76	71	27.95	13	5	11	4.33	6	2.36	69	27.17	13	5	12	4.72	5	1.97	58	22.83
18	**7**	14	5.51	11	4.33	154	60.63	18	7	14	5.51	11	4.33	152	59.84	18	7	15	5.91	10	3.94	146	57.48	18	7	15	5.91	9	3.54	142	55.91	18	7	15	5.91	9	3.54	139	54.72	18	7	15	5.91	9	3.54	135	53.15	18	7	16	6.30	7	2.76	113	44.49
25	**10**	20	7.87	16	6.30	315	124.02	25	10	20	7.87	15	5.91	310	122.05	25	10	21	8.27	14	5.51	298	117.32	25	10	22	8.66	13	5.12	290	114.17	25	10	22	8.66	13	5.12	285	112.20	25	10	22	8.66	12	4.72	276	108.66	25	10	23	9.06	10	3.94	231	90.94
29	11.6	23	9.06	18	7.09	423	166.54	29	11.6	24	9.45	18	7.09	417	164.17	29	11.6	25	9.84	16	6.30	401	157.87	29	11.6	25	9.84	16	6.30	390	153.54	29	11.6	25	9.84	15	5.91	383	150.79	29	11.6	26	10.24	14	5.51	371	146.06	29	11.6	27	10.63	11	4.33	311	122.44
34	13.3	26	10.24	21	8.27	557	219.29	34	13.3	27	10.63	20	7.87	548	215.75	34	13.3	28	11.02	19	7.48	527	207.48	34	13.3	29	11.42	18	7.09	513	201.97	34	13.3	29	11.42	17	6.69	503	198.03	34	13.3	29	11.42	17	6.69	488	192.13	34	13.3	31	12.20	13	5.12	409	161.02
36	**14**	28	11.02	22	8.66	617	242.91	36	14	28	11.02	21	8.27	607	238.98	36	14	30	11.81	20	7.87	584	229.92	36	14	30	11.81	19	7.48	568	223.62	36	14	30	11.81	18	7.09	558	219.69	36	14	31	12.20	17	6.69	540	212.60	36	14	33	12.99	14	5.51	453	178.35
38	**15**	30	11.81	24	9.45	708	278.74	38	15	30	11.81	23	9.06	697	274.41	38	15	32	12.60	21	8.27	670	263.78	38	15	32	12.60	20	7.87	652	256.69	38	15	33	12.99	20	7.87	640	251.97	38	15	33	12.99	19	7.48	620	244.09	38	15	35	13.78	15	5.91	520	204.72
39	15.4	31	12.20	24	9.45	746	293.70	39	15.4	31	12.20	23	9.06	734	288.98	39	15.4	33	12.99	22	8.66	706	277.95	39	15.4	33	12.99	21	8.27	688	270.87	39	15.4	34	13.39	20	7.87	675	265.75	39	15.4	34	13.39	19	7.48	654	257.48	39	15.4	36	14.17	15	5.91	548	215.75
43	**17**	34	13.39	27	10.63	910	358.27	43	17	35	13.78	26	10.24	895	352.36	43	17	36	14.17	24	9.45	861	338.98	43	17	37	14.57	23	9.06	838	329.92	43	17	37	14.57	22	8.66	823	324.02	43	17	38	14.96	21	8.27	797	313.78	43	17	40	15.75	17	6.69	668	262.99
47	18.5	37	14.57	29	11.42	1077	424.02	47	18.5	38	14.96	28	11.02	1060	417.32	47	18.5	39	15.35	26	10.24	1019	401.18	47	18.5	40	15.75	25	9.84	992	390.55	47	18.5	40	15.75	24	9.45	974	383.46	47	18.5	41	16.14	23	9.06	944	371.65	47	18.5	43	16.93	18	7.09	791	311.42
48	19	38	14.96	30	11.81	1136	447.24	48	19	39	15.35	29	11.42	1118	440.16	48	19	40	15.75	27	10.63	1075	423.23	48	19	41	16.14	26	10.24	1047	412.20	48	19	41	16.14	25	9.84	1028	404.72	48	19	42	16.54	24	9.45	995	391.73	48	19	44	17.32	19	7.48	834	328.35
51	20	40	15.75	32	12.60	1259	495.67	51	20	41	16.14	30	11.81	1239	487.80	51	20	42	16.54	28	11.02	1191	468.90	51	20	43	16.93	27	10.63	1160	456.69	51	20	44	17.32	26	10.24	1139	448.43	51	20	44	17.32	25	9.84	1103	434.25	51	20	47	18.50	20	7.87	924	363.78
53	21	42	16.54	33	12.99	1388	546.46	53	21	43	16.93	32	12.60	1366	537.80	53	21	44	17.32	30	11.81	1313	516.93	53	21	45	17.72	28	11.02	1279	503.54	53	21	46	18.11	27	10.63	1255	494.09	53	21	46	18.11	26	10.24	1216	478.74	53	21	49	19.29	21	8.27	1019	401.18
56	22	44	17.32	35	13.78	1523	599.61	56	22	45	17.72	34	13.39	1499	590.16	56	22	46	18.11	31	12.20	1441	567.32	56	22	47	18.50	30	11.81	1403	552.36	56	22	48	18.90	29	11.42	1378	542.52	56	22	49	19.29	27	10.63	1334	525.20	56	22	51	20.08	22	8.66	1118	440.16
58	23	46	18.11	36	14.17	1665	655.51	58	23	47	18.50	35	13.78	1638	644.88	58	23	49	19.29	32	12.60	1575	620.08	58	23	50	19.69	31	12.20	1534	603.94	58	23	50	19.69	30	11.81	1506	592.91	58	23	51	20.08	29	11.42	1458	574.02	58	23	54	21.26	23	9.06	1222	481.10
61	**24**	48	18.90	38	14.96	1813	713.78	61	24	49	19.29	37	14.57	1784	702.36	61	24	51	20.08	34	13.39	1715	675.20	61	24	52	20.47	32	12.60	1670	657.48	61	24	52	20.47	31	12.20	1639	645.28	61	24	53	20.87	30	11.81	1588	625.20	61	24	56	22.05	24	9.45	1331	524.02
64	25	50	19.69	40	15.75	1967	774.41	64	25	51	20.08	38	14.96	1935	761.81	64	25	53	20.87	35	13.78	1861	732.68	64	25	54	21.26	34	13.39	1812	713.39	64	25	54	21.26	33	12.99	1779	700.39	64	25	55	21.65	31	12.20	1723	678.35	64	25	59	23.23	25	9.84	1444	568.50
66	26	52	20.47	41	16.14	2127	837.40	66	26	53	20.87	40	15.75	2093	824.02	66	26	55	21.65	37	14.57	2013	792.52	66	26	56	22.05	35	13.78	1960	771.65	66	26	57	22.44	34	13.39	1924	757.48	66	26	58	22.83	32	12.60	1864	733.86	66	26	61	24.02	26	10.24	1562	614.96
69	27	54	21.26	43	16.93	2294	903.15	69	27	55	21.65	41	16.14	2258	888.98	69	27	57	22.44	38	14.96	2171	854.72	69	27	58	22.83	36	14.17	2114	832.28	69	27	59	23.23	35	13.78	2075	816.93	69	27	60	23.62	34	13.39	2010	791.34	69	27	63	24.80	27	10.63	1684	662.99
71	**28**	56	22.05	44	17.32	2467	971.26	71	28	57	22.44	43	16.93	2428	955.91	71	28	59	23.23	39	15.35	2334	918.90	71	28	60	23.62	38	14.96	2273	894.88	71	28	61	24.02	37	14.57	2231	878.35	71	28	62	24.41	35	13.78	2161	850.79	71	28	66	25.98	28	11.02	1811	712.99
74	29	58	22.83	46	18.11	2647	1042.13	74	29	59	23.23	44	17.32	2604	1025.20	74	29	61	24.02	41	16.14	2504	985.83	74	29	62	24.41	39	15.35	2439	960.24	74	29	63	24.80	38	14.96	2394	942.52	74	29	64	25.20	36	14.17	2318	912.60	74	29	68	26.77	29	11.42	1943	764.96
76	30	60	23.62	48	18.90	2832	1114.96	76	30	61	24.02	46	18.11	2787	1097.24	76	30	63	24.80	42	16.54	2680	1055.12	76	30	65	25.59	40	15.75	2610	1027.56	76	30	65	25.59	39	15.35	2562	1008.66	76	30	66	25.98	37	14.57	2481	976.77	76	30	70	27.56	30	11.81	2079	818.50
79	31	61	24.02	49	19.29	3024	1190.55	79	31	63	24.80	47	18.50	2976	1171.65	79	31	66	25.98	44	17.32	2862	1126.77	79	31	67	26.38	42	16.54	2787	1097.24	79	31	68	26.77	41	16.14	2735	1076.77	79	31	69	27.17	39	15.35	2649	1042.91	79	31	73	28.74	31	12.20	2220	874.02
81	**32**	63	24.80	51	20.08	3223	1268.90	81	32	65	25.59	49	19.29	3171	1248.43	81	32	68	26.77	45	17.72	3049	1200.39	81	32	69	27.17	43	16.93	2969	1168.90	81	32	70	27.56	42	16.54	2915	1147.64	81	32	71	27.95	40	15.75	2823	1111.42	81	32	75	29.53	32	12.60	2366	931.50
86	34	67	26.38	54	21.26	3638	1432.28	86	34	69	27.17	52	20.47	3580	1409.45	86	34	72	28.35	48	18.90	3442	1355.12	86	34	73	28.74	46	18.11	3352	1319.69	86	34	74	29.13	44	17.32	3290	1295.28	86	34	75	29.53	42	16.54	3187	1254.72	86	34	80	31.50	34	13.39	2671	1051.57
99	39	77	30.31	62	24.41	4787	1884.65	99	39	79	31.10	59	23.23	4710	1854.33	99	39	82	32.28	55	21.65	4529	1783.07	99	39	84	33.07	53	20.87	4410	1736.22	99	39	85	33.46	51	20.08	4329	1704.33	99	39	86	33.86	49	19.29	4193	1650.79	99	39	91	35.83	39	15.35	3514	1383.46
107	**42**	83	32.68	67	26.38	5552	2185.83	107	42	85	33.46	64	25.20	5463	2150.79	107	42	89	35.04	59	23.23	5253	2068.11	107	42	90	35.43	57	22.44	5115	2013.78	107	42	91	35.83	55	21.65	5021	1976.77	107	42	93	36.61	52	20.47	4863	1914.57	107	42	98	38.58	41	16.14	4076	1604.72
117	46	91	35.83	73	28.74	6659	2621.65	117	46	93	36.61	70	27.56	6553	2579.92	117	46	97	38.19	65	25.59	6301	2480.71	117	46	99	38.98	62	24.41	6136	2415.75	117	46	100	39.37	60	23.62	6023	2371.26	117	46	102	40.16	57	22.44	5833	2296.46	117	46	108	42.52	45	17.72	4889	1924.80
122	**48**	95	37.40	76	29.92	7251	2854.72	122	48	98	38.58	73	28.74	7135	2809.06	122	48	101	39.76	68	26.77	6861	2701.18	122	48	103	40.55	65	25.59	6681	2630.31	122	48	105	41.34	63	24.80	6558	2581.89	122	48	106	41.73	60	23.62	6352	2500.79	122	48	112	44.09	47	18.50	5323	2095.67
127	50	99	38.98	79	31.10	7868	3097.64	127	50	102	40.16	76	29.92	7742	3048.03	127	50	106	41.73	70	27.56	7444	2930.71	127	50	108	42.52	67	26.38	7249	2853.94	127	50	109	42.91	65	25.59	7116	2801.57	127	50	111	43.70	62	24.41	6892	2713.39	127	50	117	46.06	49	19.29	5776	2274.02
140	**55**	109	42.91	87	34.25	9520	3748.03	140	55	112	44.09	84	33.07	9368	3688.19	140	55	116	45.67	77	30.31	9007	3546.06	140	55	118	46.46	74	29.13	8771	3453.15	140	55	120	47.24	72	28.35	8610	3389.76	140	55	122	48.03	68	26.77	8339	3283.07	140	55	129	50.79	54	21.26	6989	2751.57
147	58	115	45.28	92	36.22	10587	4168.11	147	58	118	46.46	88	34.65	10418	4101.57	147	58	123	48.43	82	32.28	10017	3943.70	147	58	125	49.21	78	30.71	9754	3840.16	147	58	126	49.61	76	29.92	9575	3769.69	147	58	128	50.39	72	28.35	9274	3651.18	147	58	136	53.54	57	22.44	7773	3060.24
152	**60**	119	46.85	95	37.40	11330	4460.63	152	60	122	48.03	91	35.83	11148	4388.98	152	60	127	50.00	85	33.46	10720	4220.47	152	60	129	50.79	81	31.89	10439	4109.84	152	60	131	51.57	78	30.71	10247	4034.25	152	60	133	52.36	75	29.53	9924	3907.09	152	60	140	55.12	59	23.23	8318	3274.80
163	64	127	50.00	102	40.16	12891	5075.20	163	64	130	51.18	98	38.58	12684	4993.70	163	64	135	53.15	90	35.43	12197	4801.97	163	64	138	54.33	86	33.86	11877	4675.98	163	64	139	54.72	84	33.07	11658	4589.76	163	64	142	55.91	80	31.50	11292	4445.67	163	64	150	59.06	63	24.80	9464	3725.98
178	**70**	139	54.72	111	43.70	15421	6071.26	178	70	142	55.91	107	42.13	15174	5974.02	178	70	148	58.27	99	38.98	14591	5744.49	178	70	151	59.45	94	37.01	14208	5593.70	178	70	152	59.84	91	35.83	13947	5490.94	178	70	155	61.02	87	34.25	13508	5318.11	178	70	164	64.57	69	27.17	11322	4457.48
203	80	159	62.60	127	50.00	20142	7929.92	203	80	163	64.17	122	48.03	19819	7802.76	203	80	169	66.54	113	44.49	19057	7502.76	203	80	172	67.72	108	42.52	18557	7305.91	203	80	174	68.50	105	41.34	18216	7171.65	203	80	177	69.69	100	39.37	17643	6946.06	203	80	187	73.62	79	31.10	14787	5821.65
213	84	167	65.75	133	52.36	22206	8742.52	213	84	171	67.32	128	50.39	21851	8602.76	213	84	178	70.08	118	46.46	21010	8271.65	213	84	181	71.26	113	44.49	20460	8055.12	213	84	183	72.05	110	43.31	20083	7906.69	213	84	186	73.23	105	41.34	19452	7658.27	213	84	197	77.56	83	32.68	16303	6418.50
251	99	196	77.17	157	61.81	30845	12143.70	251	99	201	79.13	151	59.45	30351	11949.21	251	99	209	82.28	139	54.72	29184	11489.76	251	99	213	83.86	133	52.36	28419	11188.58	251	99	216	85.04	129	50.79	27897	10983.07	251	99	219	86.22	123	48.43	27019	10637.40	251	99	232	91.34	98	38.58	22646	8915.75
259	102	202	79.53	162	63.78	32743	12890.94	259	102	207	81.50	155	61.02	32219	12684.65	259	102	216	85.04	144	56.69	30980	12196.85	259	102	220	86.61	137	53.94	30167	11876.77	259	102	222	87.40	133	52.36	29613	11658.66	259	102	226	88.98	127	50.00	28681	11291.73	259	102	239	94.09	101	39.76	24039	9464.17
274	108	214	84.25	171	67.32	36708	14451.97	274	108	219	86.22	165	64.96	36121	14220.87	274	108	228	89.76	152	59.84	34731	13673.62	274	108	233	91.73	145	57.09	33821	13315.35	274	108	235	92.52	141	55.51	33199	13070.47	274	108	239	94.09	134	52.76	32155	12659.45	274	108	253	99.61	107	42.13	26950	10610.24
282	111	220	86.61	176	69.29	38776	15266.14	282	111	226	88.98	169	66.54	38155	15021.65	282	111	235	92.52	156	61.42	36688	14444.09	282	111	239	94.09	149	58.66	35726	14065.35	282	111	242	95.28	145	57.09	35069	13806.69	282	111	246	96.85	138	54.33	33966	13372.44	282	111	260	102.36	110	43.31	28468	11207.87
386	152	301	118.50	241	94.88	72711	28626.38	386	152	309	121.65	232	91.34	71548	28168.50	386	152	321	126.38	214	84.25	68796	27085.04	386	152	327	128.74	205	80.71	66992	26374.80	386	152	331	130.31	199	78.35	65761	25890.16	386	152	336	132.28	189	74.41	63692	25075.59	386	152	356	140.16	150	59.06	53383	21016.93

== See also ==
- Display resolution
- Computer display standard
