= MP3 SX =

mp3 SX (Stereo eXtended) is a program that allows users to upgrade mp3 stereo files to MP3 Surround files. mp3 SX analyzes the existing natural ambience of the stereo material and plays it back through the rear channels. The sound sources remain in the front channels, but are played back through the left, center, and right channel, providing a stable front image even for off-sweet-spot listening. The mp3 SX program preserves the original stereo sound stage, creating additional surround envelopment, with only 15 kB/s additional information.

Using this program, Radio Classique, a French classical music station has been streaming its programming using 5.1 surround sound on the web.
