= Height channels =

Audio channels in surround sound multichannel audio

Height channels are audio channels in surround sound multichannel audio. Height channels are located above the listening area and increase the sound field beyond the horizontal plane.

Two systems that use height channels, Dolby Pro Logic IIz and DTS Neo:X, which matrixes a front left and front right height out of the front left and front right channels. According to Dolby, non-directional ambient effects such as rain and wind are mapped to the height channels. This is similar to what is mapped to rear surround channels.

In 2002, Dolby premiered a master of We Were Soldiers which featured a Sonic Whole Overhead Sound soundtrack.

DTS-HD is a format which supports virtually any amount (over 2000) discrete channels for which a demonstration of an 11.2 system using four height channels was given at a Consumer Electronics Show.

Tomlinson Holman's 10.2 surround sound, a format currently under development, uses 12 or 14 fully discrete channels, both including two height channels; front left and front right.

Dolby Atmos surround system, which allows for unlimited number of tracks, uses height channels, too.

== See also ==
- Octophonic sound
