= MP3 Surround =

Illustration of 5.1-channels

MP3 Surround is an extension of MP3 for multi-channel audio support including 5.1 surround sound. It was developed by Fraunhofer IIS in collaboration with Thomson and Agere Systems, and released in December 2004.

MP3 Surround is backward compatible with standard MP3. The data overhead is 16 kbit/s, which allows for file sizes similar to standard stereo MP3 files. The file size is approximately 10% larger than that of a typical MP3 file. The current evaluation encoder is licensed for personal and non-commercial uses. An MP3 Surround file can be created from 5 or 6 channels of WAV audio.

Several companies, such as DivX, Inc. and Magix, have announced support for the new codec. DivX, Inc. released their first player with MP3 Surround support on September 6, 2006.

In January 2006, Thomson and Fraunhofer IIS also released two new companion technologies: Ensonido, which allows playback of MP3 Surround 5.1 channel sound through stereo headphones, and MP3 SX, which upgrades standard stereo mp3 file to mp3 surround files.

On its 5.5 release, Nullsoft Winamp has included the MP3 Surround format as a part of its integrated MPEG audio decoder (released October 10, 2007).

As of 2 July 2008, with system software v2.40, PlayStation 3 supports MP3 Surround playback.
