= Optimum HDTV viewing distance =

Television placement for immersive experience

Home-theater-oriented room

Optimum HDTV viewing distance is the distance that provides the viewer with the optimum immersive visual HDTV experience.

== Background ==
HDTV is designed to provide an experience more realistic than the television system it is designed to replace. The "thrilling realism" HDTV attempts to offer arises from increased resolution (detail) and the typically large screen sizes. A larger display increases the visual angle at which content is viewed, both of which contribute to an increased feeling of presence. Thus, the correct viewing distance is critical to the enjoyment of HDTV as it is intended. While helping to define the HDTV standard, RCA engineer and member of the US delegation to the International Telecommunication Union-Radiocommunication Sector (ITU-R), Bernard J. Lechner, made an early analysis of viewing distance, deriving the so-called Lechner distance. This approach, based on the limits of the human eye, can be used for all resolutions (including future resolutions). This is the "optimal viewing distance" found in the ITU-R.

=== Presence ===
The concept of presence has been described as the sensation of "reality", of "being there", and as "an illusion of non mediation". The concept of presence originated and was studied with regard to virtual reality (VR) and other 3D environments. It was later established that television viewers could also experience a feeling of presence. Presence is influenced by a number of factors, including video camera techniques, audio fidelity, visual and aural dimensionality, and most relevantly to this topic, image size (visual angle) and quality (angular resolution).

=== Visual angle ===
The optimum viewing distance is affected by the horizontal angle of the camera capturing the image. One concept of an ideal viewing distance places the viewer where the horizontal angle subtended by the screen is the same as the horizontal angle captured by the camera. If this is the case, the angular relationships perceived by the viewer would be identical to those recorded by the camera. A mismatch in this regard is traditionally disregarded, but some rotating motions can make these distortions very noticeable as a pincushion effect. This is likely in 3D video games, so gamers are likely to adopt close viewing positions matched to a game's fixed field of view.

If the camera's angle were always the same, an ideal viewing distance could be easily calculated. However, the camera's horizontal angle varies as the focal length of its lens changes. If the camera's sensor has fixed dimensions, a shorter focal length (wide angle) lens captures a wider angle of view, requiring the viewer to sit closer to the screen. Conversely, a longer focal length (telephoto) lens captures a narrower angle of view, demanding a more distant viewer position.

Such opposing viewing distances would not only be impractical, but would negate the very purposes of telephoto shots (for example, to see a distant object in more detail, or minimize distortion in facial images) and wide-angle shots (causing the viewer to sit too close to the screen, where undesirable image artifacts would be visible).

One compromise assumes the lens is "standard" (a 50 mm focal length, for a standard 35 mm format). A "standard" lens preserves the same spatial relationships perceived by a spectator at the camera location. For a "standard" lens image, viewing distance should be equal to the diagonal length of the screen.

Horizontal, vertical and diagonal field of view

It has been demonstrated that viewing a display that occupies a greater visual angle (also referred to as field of view) increases the feeling of presence. More importantly, the wider the visual angle (up to a plateau at approximately 80 degrees), the greater the feeling of presence.

=== Angular resolution ===
With printed graphics, resolution refers to the number of pixels (usually referred to as "dots") in a fixed linear measurement. With HDTV, resolution is measured in terms of the number of pixels in the physical display. When the resolution of a printed image is increased, the image is cleaner, crisper and more detailed. However, image quality does not improve if the increase in resolution exceeds the observer's visual capabilities. For an HDTV's image to noticeably improve, its resolution per degree of arc (or angular resolution) must increase as well as the pixel count of the display.

== Recommendations ==
To maximize the feeling of presence and thus provide a better viewing experience, the viewer would need to be situated at the theoretical spot where the HDTV occupies the widest view angle for that viewer. It is also important that the resolution of the display per degree of arc remain at a high quality level. Opinions regarding where the ideal position lies are numerous and varied.

Recommendations on HDTV viewing distances fall into two general classes; a fixed distance based on HDTV display size, or a range of distances based on the display size. The most common recommendations from reasonably authoritative sources are presented below.

=== Fixed distance ===
Fixed distance recommendations are the more common of the two types. For the most part, the majority of the fixed distance recommendations were issued before the end of 2007, when arguably HDTV displays were still in the early adoption phase. The concept of optimal viewing distance, which is based on physics and physiology, has become essential with the advent of UHD (Ultra High Definition) technology. This new technology allows for much shorter viewing distances, which requires greater precision.

==== Optimal viewing distance for TV and cinema ====
The "optimal viewing distance" is based on the limits of the human eye, i.e. its angle of resolution. This is its ability to distinguish between two pixels. For normal visual acuity (6/6 vision), this angle is 1 arcmin. To obtain a fixed distance for a given resolution, it must be expressed in picture heights (H). If a screen is 50 cm high and it is at a distance of 250 cm, then in picture heights, its distance is 5 H (250/50). Mathematically, this gives the distances shown in the following table:

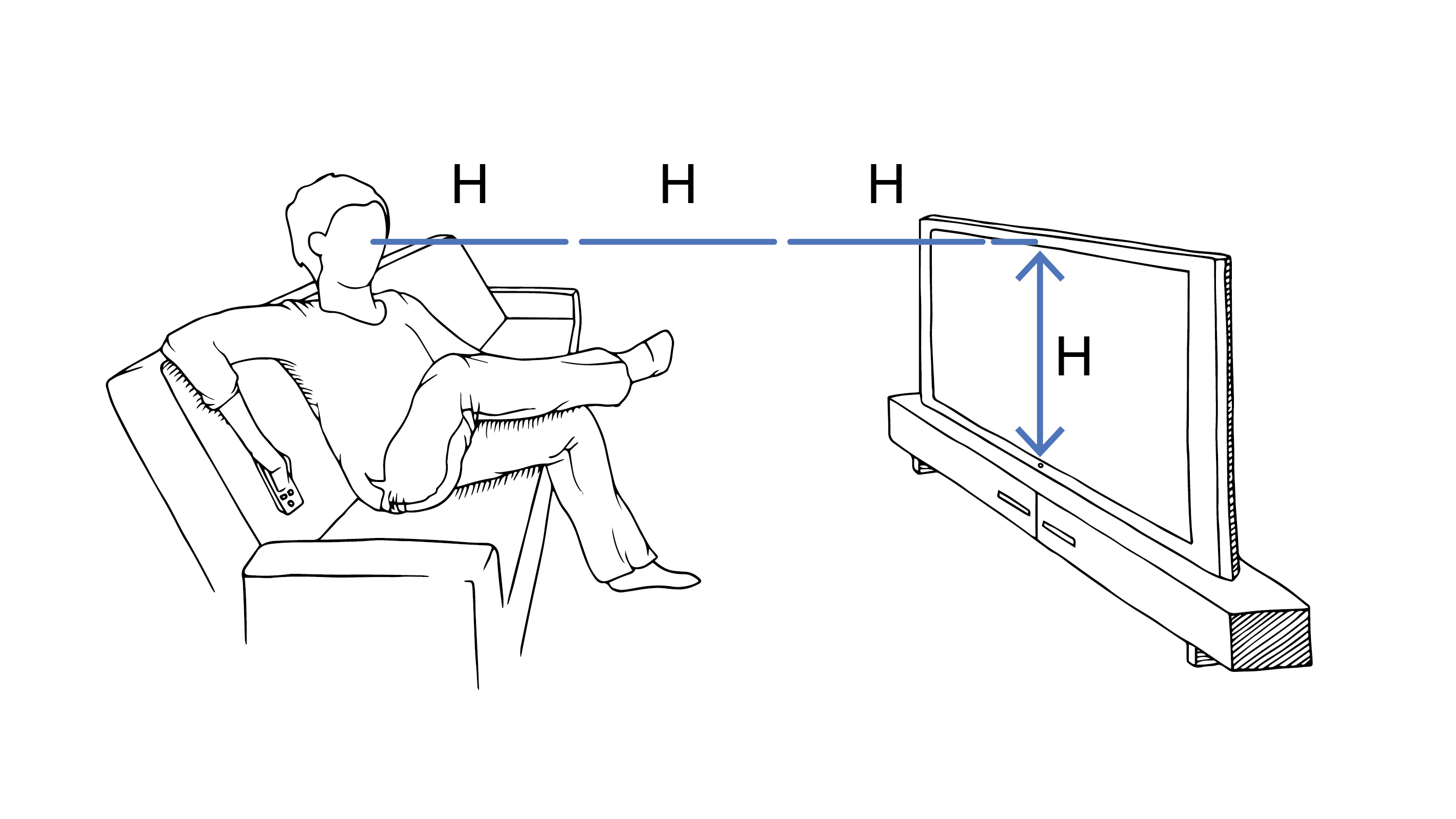
Distance in picture heights. Here the distance is 3.2 picture heights (H). This is the optimal viewing distance for HD 1080 video.

| | Resolution | Opti. Dist. |
|---|---|---|
| NTSC | (640) × 480 | 7.2 H |
| PAL SECAM | (720) × 576 | 6.0 H |
| HD 720 | 1280 × 720 | 4.8 H |
| HD 1080 | 1920 × 1080 | 3.2 H |
| 4K UHD | 3840 × 2160 | 1.6 H |
| 8K UHD | 7680 × 4320 | 0.8 H |

This table can be used in a number of ways :

- Find the optimal distance for a given screen. Example: for a 4K UHD screen 140 cm high (112 inches diagonal), the optimal distance is 140 × 1.6 = 224 cm.
- Find the right screen size. Example: for a 1080 HDTV used at a distance of 250 cm, you need to find a screen whose height is close to 250/3.2 = 78 cm (63 inches diagonally).
- Find the right video resolution. Example: a 53 cm high screen (43 inches diagonal), located at a distance of 300 cm, does not need to show video with a resolution higher than HD 720. Presenting a higher resolution means a larger ecological footprint with no perceptible gain.
- Find the best seat in the cinema. DCI 4K cinema has the same number of lines as 4K UHD (the DCI 4K format is wider). The optimal distance is therefore 1.6 times the height of the screen. The best compromise with the ideal listening zone, the sweet spot, must be found; "Sound is 50 percent of the movie going experience" - George Lucas.

Please note! The optimal viewing distance is not suitable for designing a user interface; It is the distance actually observed in households that should be used. It is much greater than the optimal viewing distance and highly variable.

==== Diagonal measurement ====
===== × 2.5 (corresponding to 20-degree viewing angle) =====
One of the more popular recommendations on the proper HDTV viewing distance is multiply the diagonal measurement of the display screen by 2.5. This recommendation is cited by television manufacturers, retailers, respected publications and websites, though the popular electronics review website CNET suggests that high-resolution content can be watched at a closer distance – 1.5 times the display screen's diagonal measurement (corresponding to 32 degree viewing angle).

===== × 1.6 (corresponding to 30-degree viewing angle) =====
Viewing an HDTV from a position where the display occupies a 30-degree field of view is widely quoted as the SMPTE (or SMPTE 30) recommendation (equivalent to about 1.6264 times the screen size in a 16:9 TV). This recommendation is very popular with the home theater enthusiast community, appears in books on home theater design, and is also supported by a white paper produced by Fujitsu. Although an article on research into setting the specification for the next evolution of HDTV, Ultra HDTV (or UHDTV), does support the premise that HDTV was optimized for a view angle of 30 degrees, there seems to be no direct recommendation from SMPTE on the issue.

===== × 1.2 (corresponding to 40-degree viewing angle) =====
THX recommends that the "best seat-to-screen distance" is one where the view angle approximates 40 degrees, (the actual angle is 40.04 degrees). Their recommendation was originally presented at the 2006 CES show, and was stated as being the theoretical maximum horizontal view angle, based on average human vision. In the opinion of THX, the location where the display is viewed at a 40-degree view angle provides the most "immersive cinematic experience", all else being equal. For consumer application of their recommendations, THX recommends dividing the diagonal screen measurement by .84 to calculate the optimum viewing distance, for a 1080p resolution. This equates to multiplying the diagonal measurement by about 1.2.

=== Optimum ranges ===
Stating optimum viewing distance as a range rather than as fixed distance is on the rise; possibly because of changes in the profile of the typical HDTV purchaser. Early adopters of HDTV were typically videophiles, the technically adventurous and the sports enthusiast looking to have the ultimate viewing experience. Today, the typical HDTV consumer's aims may be a little more modest; total immersion takes a back seat to room integration. Major retail chains like Best Buy that once stated their recommendation as a fixed distance, are starting to provide range recommendations. Manufacturers have also started to provide range recommendations, updating their websites with small applications that denote the optimum viewing distance as a range of distances. THX in March 2009 added range recommendations to their website. The minimum of the range tends to be the proponent's fixed optimum distance recommendation.

==== Manufacturers' recommendations ====
Range recommendations from manufacturers are the most modest of the groupings. For the minimum (or nearest) viewing distance, they recommend a view angle of approximately 31 degrees; and for the maximum, a view angle as low as 10 degrees. A 10-degree view angle is approximately the angle that NTSC television was typically viewed from.

RCA
| Screen Size | Recommended Range |
|---|---|
| 22" | 3'0" – 8'4" (0.9 – 2.5 m) |
| 26" | 3'5" – 9'10" (1.0 – 3.0 m) |
| 32" | 4'4" – 12'1" (1.3 – 3.7 m) |
| 40" | 5'4" – 15'1" (1.6 – 4.6 m) |
| 42" | 5'5" – 15'10" (1.7 – 4.8 m) |
| 52" | 6'0" – 17'0" (1.8 – 5.2 m) |

TOSHIBA
| Screen Size | Recommended Range |
|---|---|
| 40" | 4.0′ - 6.3′ (1.22 – 1.92 m) |
| 42" | 4.2′ - 6.7′ (1.28 – 2.04 m) |
| 46" | 4.6′ - 7.3′ (1.4 – 2.22 m) |
| 47" | 4.7′ - 7.4′ (1.43 – 2.26 m) |
| 50" | 5.0′ - 7.9′ (1.52 – 2.41 m) |
| 55" | 5.5′ - 8.7′ (1.68 – 2.65 m) |
| 65" | 6.5′ - 10.3′ (1.98 – 3.14 m) |

==== Retail recommendations ====
The recommendations currently posted on the websites of retailers Best Buy and Crutchfield take more of a middle ground. Both retailers post a minimum viewing distance that accommodates a view angle of just a little over 32 degrees on average. This viewing distance approximates the view angle needed to be able to see pixel level detail. The maximum viewing distance will provide a viewing angle of approximately 16 degrees with Best Buy's recommendation and approximately 20 degrees with Crutchfield's. The maximum viewing distance (minimum viewing angle) provided by Best Buy aligns with vision theory on the highest spatial frequencies perceivable by the human visual system. Crutchfield's maximum viewing distance aligns with the lower boundaries where viewers typically begin to find HDTV immersive.

BEST BUY
| Screen Size | Recommended Range |
|---|---|
| 26" | 3.3' – 6.5' (1.0 m – 2.0 m) |
| 30" | 3.8' – 7.6' (1.2 m – 2.3 m) |
| 34" | 4.3' – 8.5' (1.3 m – 2.6 m) |
| 42" | 5.3' – 10.5' (1.6 m – 3.2 m) |
| 46" | 5.8' – 11.5' (1.8 m – 3.5 m) |
| 50" | 6.3' – 12.5' (1.9 m – 3.8 m) |
| 55" | 6.8' – 12.8' (2.1 m – 3.9 m) |
| 60" | 7.5' – 15.0' (2.3 m – 4.6 m) |
| 65" | 8.1' – 16.3' (2.5 m – 5.0 m) |

CRUTCHFIELD
| Screen Size | Recommended Range |
|---|---|
| 26" | 3.25' – 5.5' (1.0 m – 1.7 m) |
| 32" | 4.0' – 6.66' (1.2 m – 2.0 m) |
| 37" | 4.63' – 7.71' (1.4 m – 2.4 m) |
| 40" | 5.0' – 8.33' (1.5 m – 2.5 m) |
| 42" | 5.25' – 8.75' (1.6 m – 2.7 m) |
| 46" | 5.75' – 9.5' (1.7 m – 2.9 m) |
| 50" | 6.25' – 10.5' (1.9 m – 3.2 m) |
| 52" | 6.5' – 10.8' (2.0 m – 3.3 m) |
| 55" | 6.9' – 11.5' (2.1 m – 3.5 m) |
| 58" | 7.25' – 12.0' (2.2 m – 3.7 m) |
| 65" | 8.13' – 13.5' (2.5 m – 4.1 m) |
| 70" | 8.75' – 14.75' (2.7 m – 4.5 m) |

==== THX ranges ====
While THX still contends that the optimum viewing distance is a position where the display occupies a 40-degree view angle for the viewer, they too provide a range recommendation. The minimum viewing distance is set to approximate a 40-degree view angle, and the maximum viewing distance is set to approximate 28 degrees.

THX
| Screen Size | Recommended Range |
|---|---|
| 35" | 3.5' – 5.0' (1.0 – 1.5 m) |
| 40" | 4.0' – 6.0' (1.2 – 1.8 m) |
| 50" | 5' – 7.5' (1.5 – 2.2 m) |
| 60" | 6.0' – 9.0' (1.8 – 2.7 m) |

=== Screen height ===
Consideration should also be given to the height at which the screen is placed. A common suggestion is that the viewer's eyes are horizontally level with the bottom or middle of the display, so that the screen does not overpower the viewer. THX recommends that a viewer should not have to look up more than 15 degrees.

== Factors influencing the calculations ==
Each recommendation serves the underlying goal of the organization that proposes it. Manufacturers will have an easier time selling their HDTVs if they support a position that does not require consumers to purchase as large a set as required by the THX recommendations. In the absence of economic influences, calculating the best screen-size-to-distance ratio that will produce the utmost feeling of presence is not at all straightforward.

There are a number of factors that can affect the calculation including the limitations of the human visual system, the technological limitations of HDTV displays, human physiological considerations, the content that will be viewed, and the interpretation of empirical data from formal testing. There is also the fact that the screen image is on a flat plane and not curved. Perhaps the biggest of these are uncertainties surrounding the limits of the human visual system, and how those limitations apply to what we see and perceive. A further, more practical consideration, is one of room size, including the position of speakers, seating and other furniture in the room.

=== Human visual system limitation ===
The human visual system has a fixed capacity to detect detail from a distance. Our understanding of limitations with regard to visual detail recognition and identification from a distance is primarily based on the work of Dr. Hermann Snellen. Dr. Snellen developed the eye examination chart that bears his name (Snellen chart). From his findings and the work of others over the last hundred years, one arcminute is seen as the threshold beyond which critical detail cannot be identified by a person with normal vision. An arcminute is an angular measurement, which is equal to 1/60 of one degree of a circle.

Normal vision is referenced as 20/20 vision in North America, the British Isles, and 6/6 vision in continental Europe respectively. The visual acuity threshold has been identified as a constraint factor in the recommendations on the optimum viewing distance for HDTV, and also in formal research that comment on the subject of television and angular resolution. Assuming display is flat, with 1 arcminute as the constraint for seeing critical detail, in order not to miss any detail a viewer would need to be situated at a position where their view angle to a 1080p HDTV is approximately 31.2 degrees or greater (32 degrees for spherical display), for 2160p HDTV approximately 58.37 degrees or greater (64 degrees for spherical display) and for 4320p HDTV approximately 96.33 degrees or greater (128 degrees for spherical display). However, there is not always agreement that the Snellenian limit should be the constraining factor.

To calculate the viewing distance, based on display size and content resolution, the following formula may be used:

$\textrm{VD}=\frac{\textrm{DS}}{\left(\sqrt{\left(\frac{\textrm{NHR}}{\textrm{NVR}}\right)^2+1}\right) \cdot \textrm{CVR} \cdot \tan{\frac{1}{60}}}$

Where:

VD: Viewing distance
DS: Display's diagonal size
NHR: Display's native horizontal resolution (in pixels)
NVR: Display's native vertical resolution (in pixels)
CVR: Vertical resolution of the video being displayed (in pixels)

Note: Make sure the angle mode is set to degrees when calculating the tangent. If using a spreadsheet such as Excel, you must multiply the angle by PI()/180. If DS is given in inches, VD will be in inches. If VD in meters is desired, multiply VD by 2.54 and divide by 100.

Example for DVD video on a 32-inch 1080p HDTV:

$\textrm{VD}=\frac{\textrm{32}}{\left(\sqrt{\left(\frac{\textrm{1920}}{\textrm{1080}}\right)^2+1}\right) \cdot \textrm{480} \cdot \tan{\frac{1}{60}}}=112.36$ (inches)

Example for high-def video on a 32-inch 1080p HDTV:

$\textrm{VD}=\frac{\textrm{32}}{\left(\sqrt{\left(\frac{\textrm{1920}}{\textrm{1080}}\right)^2+1}\right) \cdot \textrm{1080} \cdot \tan{\frac{1}{60}}}=49.94$ (inches)

Sitting beyond these distances will result in a loss of detail.

A 1998 Sun Microsystems paper on the limits of human vision and video display systems uses a different constraint value of approximately 1/2 an arc minute (or 30 arc seconds), when estimating the saturation point for the human visual system. With 30 arc seconds as the constraint, the view angle necessary to see all the detail provided by an HDTV with a 1080p resolution drops to approximately 16.1 degrees. Furthermore, several academic articles have challenged the notion that 1 arcminute of resolution is the typical resolving power of the human eye, suggesting that on average, we can resolve detail smaller than that.

Also, there is the issue of vernier acuity, which is the eye's ability to detect an offset between 2 lines and stereoacuity, which is the ability to discriminate depth by the use of both eyes. Vernier acuity and stereoacuity are cited as being detected with only a 2–4 arc second degree of separation. Ultimately all of the various types of acuity play a part in how we see things and more importantly, how we perceive what we are witnessing. The complexities of the human visual system and the relationship between different types of acuity are not yet fully understood. Thus, depending on which human visual system constraints are applied, viewing angles calculations will vary to some degree, especially when technological constraints are factored in.

=== Technology limitations ===
Magnification of the pixel grid

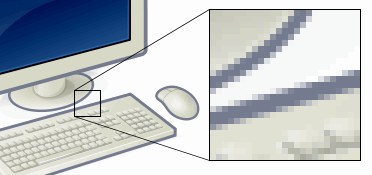
Image with a portion greatly enlarged, showing how individual pixels are rendered

While viewing an HDTV display from a shorter distance can produce an increased sense of presence, the limitations of technology can have an adverse effect if the viewer is too close to the display. If you examine an LCD or plasma HDTV display when it is turned off, you can see the construction of the pixel grid. Turning the display on doesn't completely mask this. If you are too close to the display when it is on, it can look as though you're viewing it through a screen door. Even with different HDTV display technology, such as front or rear projection DLP, LCoS or laser TV, the way HDTV images are rendered limits how close a viewer can be before the image's segmented nature becomes evident.

HDTV displays produce images the same way computer bitmaps (also known as raster graphics) are produced, using a mosaic of colored 4-sided pixels. Like computer monitors, each HDTV display has a video resolution consisting of rows and columns of specific numbers of pixels. From far enough away, the human eye perceives the illuminated pixels as a smooth image. As one gets closer, a point occurs where the blocky appearance of individual pixels becomes apparent. The image then loses its smoothness, its perceived quality drops, and the advantage of closer viewing becomes a disadvantage.

Calculating the point where the human eye can detect pixels is not straightforward. Obviously, people's visual acuity varies greatly. But pixel geometry varies as well, in shape and spacing (known as interpixel gap), depending on a display's technology and design.

=== Human physiological considerations ===
Research conducted on presence with HDTV and other higher resolution formats that use a wide field display, has revealed that sometimes the feeling of presence can be too real, producing physiological effect that some viewers may find undesirable. Subjects have reported experiencing an increase in symptoms that are common to motion sickness when viewing strong visual stimuli on large screens. A study conducted using virtual reality simulation as part of the experiment, found that subjects with lower visual acuity experienced significantly more of the symptoms associated with motion sickness.

Furthermore, the study also found that the symptoms of motion sickness increased when subjects observed the visual stimuli without the aid of their glass or contact lenses. Consequently, optimum viewing distance recommendations based solely on human visual system and technological limitations may not always produce the best viewing experience. Viewers with lower visual acuity, who prefer to watch HDTV without their corrective lenses may want to sit closer to see critical details and run the risk of undesirable side effects.

=== End-user content selection ===
Although studies show the feeling of presence and image size are directly correlated, calculating the size to viewing distance relationship may not be a necessary exercise for all consumers. A 1997 study, which hypothesized that increases in screen size would give rise to increased feelings of presence, found that the content was more important than the screen size. The findings were that for commercials, action-adventure and reality programming an increase in the feeling of presence did correlate with increased size. The researcher attributed these findings to the fact that the aforementioned content contained scenes that were shot with a point of view camera, scenes with sudden movements and shorter shots. Conversely, for programming consisting of talk shows and drama programs changing the screen size had no effect on the feeling of presence.

== See also ==
- Contrast sensitivity
- View Angle
- Large-screen television technology
- HDTV
- Home Theater
- Sweet spot (acoustics)
