= Ensonido =

Ensonido is a real-time post processing algorithm that allows users to play back MP3 Surround files in standard headphones. Ensonido was developed by the Fraunhofer Society. It simulates the natural reception of surround sound by the human ear, which usually receives tones from surrounding loudspeakers and from reflections and echoes of the listening room. The out-of-head localization achieved that way increases the listening comfort noticeably in contrast to conventional stereo headphone listening with its in-head localization of all sounds. In version 3.0 of the Fraunhofer IIS MP3 Surround Player, Ensonido is replaced with newer mp3HD.
