= Double MS recording =

Audio recording technique

Double MS recording is an audio recording technique used to record surround sounds using three microphones. The mid mic usually a cardioid mic, the sides using a figure of 8 mic, and the rear using another cardioid mic. This is usually used for recording ambiance sounds and not live music.

From these three tracks, five channels can be extracted:

- Center= Mid/Mid Mic
- Left=Mid+Side
- Right=Mid+Invert(Side)
- Surround Left=Rear+Side
- Surround Right=Rear+Invert(Side)

A minor variation of this technique is employed in video cameras that record 5.1 surround sound. In this case: five microphones are used. Cardioid mid and rear microphones are used as stated above, but in this case the (normally) bi-directional side microphone is replaced by a pair of cardioid microphones facing left and right. This allows the low frequency effect microphone to be placed at the centre of a Greek cross microphone assembly. The five main channels are recovered as above. The downside of using 2 cardioid microphones in place of a single bi-directional is that the directivity of the recorded sound compared with the live is not so pronounced.
