= Chris Kyriakakis =

- Born: Thessaloniki, Greece
- Education: Caltech
- Known for: New methods for automatic acoustic correction
- Scientific career
- Fields: Audio signal processing, acoustics, archaeoacoustics
- Workplaces: University of Southern California

Chris Kyriakakis (born 1963) is a professor of electrical engineering, author, and inventor of audio technologies. He is the co-inventor of the Audyssey MultEQ digital room correction system. In 2004 he co-founded Audyssey Laboratories.

== Biography ==
Kyriakakis attended high school at Anatolia College in Thessaloniki, Greece. He received a Bachelor of Science in Engineering and Applied Science from Caltech in 1985 and a PhD in Electrical Engineering from the University of Southern California in 1993.

Kyriakakis was appointed to the EE Systems faculty at USC in 1996 where he became the founding director of the USC Immersive Audio Laboratory. He teaches audio signal processing, acoustics, and psychoacoustics at the University of Southern California. He was part of the original team of researchers that founded the Integrated Media Systems Center, a National Science Foundation engineering research center that was awarded to USC in 1996. He later served as the Director of the Computer Interfaces group. He became deputy director of IMSC in 2003.

Kyriakakis has authored and co-authored nearly 100 peer-reviewed technical papers. In 2006 he co-authored the book Immersive Audio Signal Processing.

His first notable contribution in the field of audio was the introduction of the concept of Virtual Microphones.

Kyriakakis' research has received funding from the National Science Foundation, DARPA, the United States Army, as well as several industry sponsors.

== Recent work ==
Together with Prof. Sharon Gerstel (UCLA), Kyriakakis is part of an interdisciplinary group that is studying the role of acoustics in Byzantine churches. In 2017 he organized a virtual 8th century performance in Byzantium 2.0: Acoustic Time Travel

== Recognition ==
In 2011 his research was featured in The New York Times.

In 2012 his research was featured in NPR All Things Considered.

In 2016 his research on Archaeoacoustics was featured in The Atlantic, Open Culture, Faith and Form,; CBC Radio Spark Escape Velocity, and Trojan Family Magazine.
