= Bernard J. Lechner =

American electronics engineer (1932–2014)

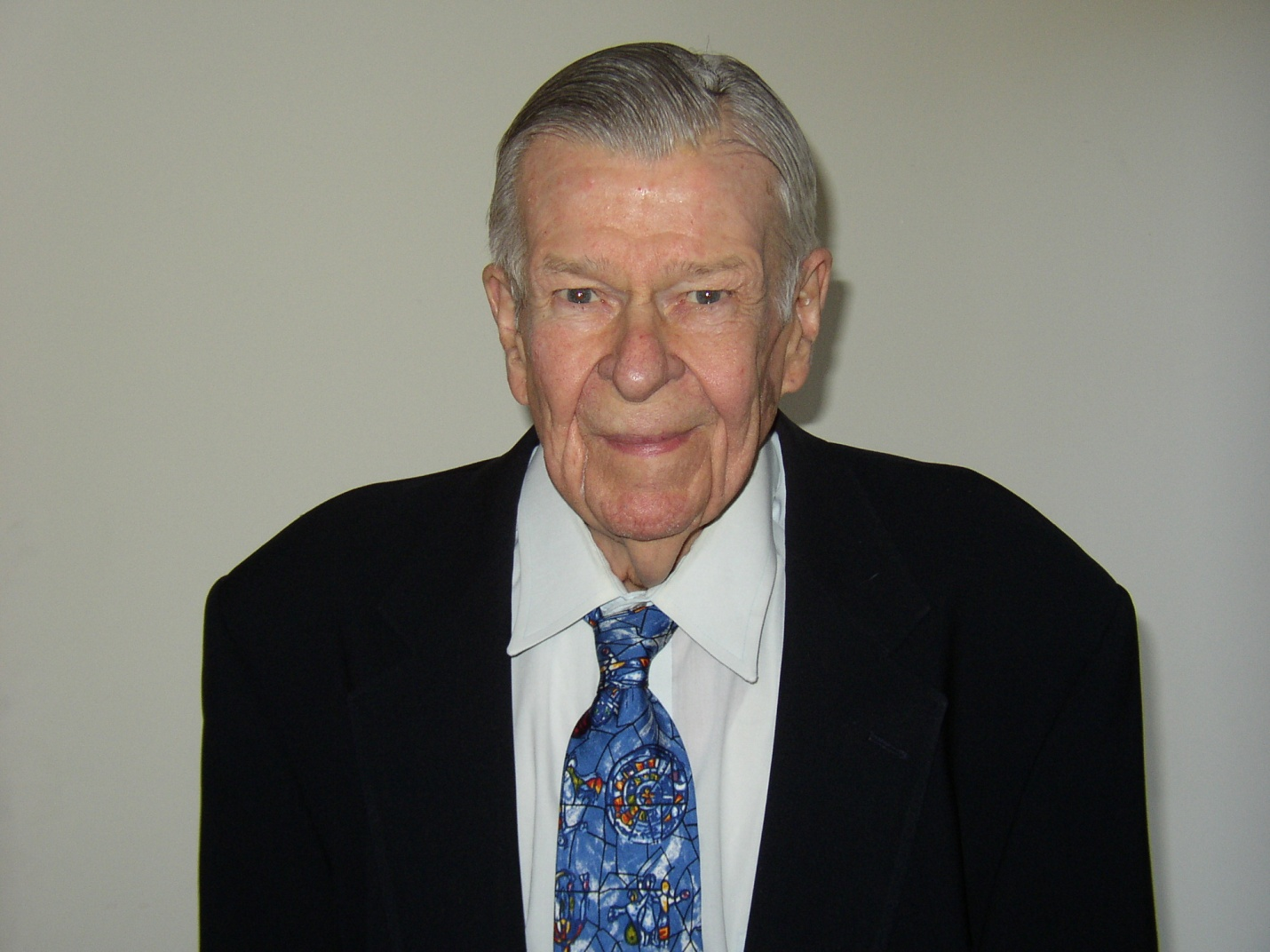
- Bernard J. Lechner in 2011
- Born: Bernard J. Lechner; January 25, 1932; New York City, New York, U.S.
- Died: April 11, 2014 (aged 82); Trenton, New Jersey
- Education: New Rochelle High School; Columbia University (B.S.E.E.)
- Awards: SID Frances Rice Darne Award; Beatrice Winner Award; David Sarnoff Medal; Progress Medal
- Scientific career
- Fields: electronics engineering
- Workplaces: RCA Laboratories; Princeton University; Harvard School of Business; IEEE; SID; SMPTE honor societies Tau Beta Pi, Eta Kappa Nu and Sigma Xi
- Thesis: "Testing HDTV terrestrial broadcasting systems" "Scanning the issue-Special issue on consumer electronics" "The ATSC Transport Layer, Including Program and System Information Protocol (PSIP)" "It's a High-Definition World", "History Crystallized: A First-Person Account of the Development of Matrix-Addressed LCDs for Television at RCA in the 1960s"

Bernard J. Lechner (January 25, 1932 – April 11, 2014) was an electronics engineer and formerly vice president, RCA Laboratories, where he worked for 30 years covering various aspects of television and information display technologies.

== Biography ==
Lechner was born in New York City, N.Y., in 1932. He grew up and attended high school in New Rochelle, New York. According to his oral history recollections, he was already very interested in radio and TV receivers during his high school years. He built sets with commercially available kits.

Then, he studied electrical engineering at the Columbia University in New York City, interrupted by two years service for the U.S. Army Signal Corps in the US and Germany. He received the B.S.E.E. degree in 1957.

In 1957, he joined the RCA Laboratories in Princeton, New Jersey, as Member of Technical Staff and worked on various aspects of video engineering such as a home video tape recorder, two-way cable TV services (pay-TV and interactive shopping), TV tuners and TV broadcast cameras. He headed various RCA research groups working on these developments.

While already working at RCA, he did graduate work at Princeton University and at the Harvard School of Business.

Bernie died on April 11, 2014.

=== Active matrix addressing ===
George H. Heilmeier, who had joined the RCA Laboratories a year after Lechner, started working with liquid crystals in 1964. A team led by Heilmeier developed the first liquid crystal displays (LCD). Lechner joined the efforts with the intention of applying LCDs to TV screens. For this purpose, Lechner's team studied simple matrix LCDs with a few lines and columns. It became obvious that there were tight limitations for the number of picture elements (pixels) addressable by a direct-drive addressing scheme (passive matrix addressing) due to the limited contrast and response speed. Lechner was first to apply a sample-and-hold technique to this type of display by connecting a capacitor in parallel with each LCD pixel and controlling its charge through a field-effect transistor. Later-on, this technique was called active matrix addressing employing thin-film transistors (TFT). It helped, that the semiconductor operation of RCA was among the leaders of MOS-FET developments (CMOS 4000 series). At a press conference at RCA Headquarters in New York, a demonstration of such an LC matrix display with 36 pixels, using discrete components, took place in 1968 and showed the feasibility of the concept for TV panels. A corresponding publication followed in 1969.

RCA reduced the efforts on LCDs and sold the remaining operations in 1976. Lechner concentrated his work on advanced video systems. He became RCA staff vice president for these activities. In this capacity he was a member of the US delegation to the Comité Consultatif International pour la Radio (CCIR, now ITU-R) in Geneva for a new HDTV standard from 1989 to 1990.

=== Lechner distance ===
The Lechner Distance chart illustrates the optimal viewing distances at which the human eye can best process the details an HDTV resolution has to offer. For example, the optimal viewing distance for a 42 inches (110 cm) Full HD TV (1080p) is 5.5 feet (170 cm).

Lechner researched the typical distance between a viewer and their television screen by taking measurements in many American homes. The median distance compiled from all his data came out to 9 feet (2.7 m). Given this distance, a Full HD TV (1080p) with a screen size of 69 inches (180 cm) would deliver the optimal viewing resolution.

When GE acquired RCA and gave the David Sarnoff Research Center to SRI International in 1987, Lechner took early retirement. Lechner continued his work as independent consultant serving on standard committees and in related organizations as well as an expert witness in patent cases.

== Memberships and awards ==
Lechner was a Fellow of the IEEE, the Society for Information Display (SID) and the Society of Motion Picture and Television Engineers (SMPTE). He was a member of the honor societies Tau Beta Pi, Eta Kappa Nu and Sigma Xi.

In 1971, he was named the first recipient of the SID Frances Rice Darne Award for his outstanding contributions to matrix displays and in 1983, he was named the first recipient of the Beatrice Winner Award for his contributions to SID. He was awarded the David Sarnoff Medal in 1996 and the Progress Medal in 2001 by the Society of Motion Picture and Television Engineers (SMPTE) for his many contributions to the technologies essential to today's television systems. Lechner received two RCA Laboratories Outstanding Achievement Awards and a David Sarnoff Team Award in Science. In 2000, the Advanced Television Systems Committee (ATSC) established the Bernard J. Lechner Award in his honor. In 2011, he received the IEEE Jun-ichi Nishizawa Medal for conceiving the principle of active matrix LCDs (AMLCD)

== Selected publications ==
Lechner has widely published in the areas of displays and television systems. He also holds ten United States patents.

- Lechner, B.J.: Testing HDTV terrestrial broadcasting systems, IEEE Transactions on Broadcasting, Vol. 37 (1991), No. 4, pp. 148–151
- Kressel H. and Lechner, B. J. (guest editors): Scanning the issue-Special issue on consumer electronics, Proc. IEEE, Vol. 82 (1994), No. 4, pp. 445–458
- Lechner, B.J.; Chernock, R.; Eyer, M.K.; Goldberg, A.; Goldman, M.S.: The ATSC Transport Layer, Including Program and System Information Protocol (PSIP), Proceedings of the IEEE, Vol. 94 (2006), No. 1, pp. 77–101
- Lechner, B.J.: Guest Editorial, It's a High-Definition World, Information Display, Vol. 23, No. 11, November 2007
- Lechner, B.J.: History Crystallized: A First-Person Account of the Development of Matrix-Addressed LCDs for Television at RCA in the 1960s, Information Display, Vol. 24, No. 1, January 2008

== See also ==
- Visual acuity
