= Sweet spot (acoustics) =

Ideal position for listening to speakers

The sweet spot is a term used by audiophiles and recording engineers to describe the focal point between two speakers, where an individual is fully capable of hearing the stereo audio mix the way it was intended to be heard by the mixer. The sweet spot is the location which creates an equilateral triangle together with the stereo loudspeakers, the stereo triangle. In the case of surround sound, this is the focal point between four or more speakers, i.e., the location at which all wave fronts arrive simultaneously. In international recommendations the sweet spot is referred to as reference listening point.

Different static methods exist to broaden the area of the sweet spot. A discussion of methods and their benefits can be found in Merchel et al. By means of such methods more than one listener can enjoy the sound experience as intended by the audio engineer, including the desired phantom source locations, spectral and spatial balance and degree of immersion. Alternatively, the sweet spot can be adjusted dynamically to the actual position of the listener. Therefore, a correct phantom source localization is possible over the whole listening area. This approach is implemented in the open source project SweetSpotter. Massive multi-channel audio systems that apply wave field synthesis or higher order ambisonics exhibit an extended optimal listening area instead of a sweet spot.

Sound engineers also refer to the sweet spot of any noise-producing body that may be captured with a microphone. Every individual instrument has its own sweet spot, the perfect location to place the microphone or microphones, in order to obtain the best sound.
