= Tomlinson Holman =

American audio engineer (born 1946)

Tomlinson Miles Holman II (born 1946) is an American film theorist, audio engineer, and inventor of film technologies, notably Lucasfilm's THX sound system. He developed the world's first 10.2 sound system.

== Career ==
Early in his career, Holman developed what was known as the Holman Preamplifier for the APT Corporation, a former Massachusetts entity founded by Holman. He holds a Bachelor of Science from the University of Illinois at Urbana–Champaign (1968).

In 2002 he received the Academy Award for Technical Achievement. Specifically, for "the research and system integration resulting in the improvement of motion picture loudspeaker systems".

In 2007 he received the IEEE Masaru Ibuka Award.

Holman taught film and television sound at the School of Cinematic Arts, University of Southern California from 1987 to 2011.

In 2011 - 2021, Softpedia reported that Apple Inc. had employed Holman, and speculated that this was to work on audio projects.

== Books ==
- Sound for Film and Television (2001)
- Surround Sound: Up and Running (2008)

== See also ==
- James A. Moorer
