= X-Fi =

X-Fi may refer to:

- X-Fi (audio chip), an audio processor by Creative Labs
- Sound Blaster X-Fi a line of PC sound cards by Creative Labs utilizing the audio chip of the same name
