= Audiokinetic =

Canadian software company

Audiokinetic Inc.
- Type: Subsidiary
- Industry: Software
- Founded: 2000; 26 years ago
- Headquarters: Montreal, Quebec, Canada
- Products: Wwise
- Parent: Sony Interactive Entertainment (2019–present)
- Subsidiaries: Audiokinetic Montreal Audiokinetic Tokyo
- Website: audiokinetic.com

Audiokinetic Inc. is a Canadian software company based in Montreal, Quebec that develops audio software for the video game industry. Its main product is Wwise audio authoring software. On January 8, 2019, Sony Interactive Entertainment announced that they had acquired the company.

== History ==
Audiokinetic was founded in 2000 by Martin H. Klein, a veteran of the music, film, and gaming industries.

In 2003, Audiokinetic was granted funding by the Alliance numériQC, the Quebec digital industry network.

In 2006, Microsoft Game Studios (MGS) signed a long-term licensing agreement with Audiokinetic. The first game to use Audiokinetic's software was FASA Interactive's Shadowrun.

In January 2007, Audiokinetic entered into an educational partnership with the Conservatory of Recording Arts and Sciences. The Conservatory will teach Audiokinetic's Wwise software platform in its Audio for Games curriculum and will further develop an authorized Manufacturer Certification for the product.

In November 2007, Audiokinetic joined the Emergent Game Technologies Premier Partners Program. As part of this exclusive agreement, Audiokinetic became Emergent's only audio premier partner, and Wwise was integrated with Gamebryo, Emergent's game development framework.

In November 2008, Audiokinetic released SoundSeed, a family of sound generators for game audio that uses digital sound processing (DSP) technology.

In February 2011, Sony announced that the PlayStation Vita will be the first portable device to support Audiokinetic.

In February 2013, Audiokinetic opened a Japanese office in Tokyo.

In January 2015, Audiokinetic and CRAS announced the creation of an Online Certification Program for Wwise.

In March 2015, Audiokinetic and Steinberg announced a partnership to integrate Wwise with a new DAW, Nuendo 7.

On 8 January 2019, Sony announced that the company had entered into a definitive agreement for Sony Interactive Entertainment to acquire Audiokinetic.

== Products ==
- Wwise – software for interactive media and video games

== See also ==
- AMD TrueAudio
