= DTS, Inc. =

Series of multichannel audio technologies

- Trade name: DTS
- Type: Subsidiary
- Industry: Audio, audio data compression, audio encoding, audio remastering
- Predecessor: Ultra Stereo
- Founded: October 1990; 36 years ago (as Digital Theater Systems, Inc.)
- Founder: Terry Beard
- Headquarters: Calabasas, California, United States
- Key people: Jon Kirchner (chairman and CEO)
- Products: DTS-HD Master Audio Suite; DTS HD Surround Audio Suite; HD Radio; DTS:X; Headphone:X; Play-Fi
- Parent: Xperi
- Subsidiaries: HD Radio (iBiquity); Manzanita Systems; Phorus; SRS Labs
- Website: dts.com

DTS (an initialism of its original name, Digital Theater Systems) is an American company that makes multichannel audio technologies for film and video. Based in Calabasas, California, the company introduced its DTS technology in 1993 as a competitor to Dolby Laboratories, incorporating DTS in the film Jurassic Park (1993). The technology is used in surround sound formats for both commercial/theatrical and consumer-grade applications. It was known as The Digital Experience until 1995. DTS licenses its technologies to consumer electronics manufacturers.

DTS, Inc. was acquired by Tessera Technologies Inc., in December 2016 and combined under the newly created Tessera Holding Corporation. The combined company was renamed to Xperi Corporation in February 2017.

== History ==
DTS was founded by Terry Beard, an audio engineer and Caltech graduate. Beard, speaking to a friend of a friend, was able to get in touch with Steven Spielberg to audition a remastering of Spielberg's film Close Encounters of the Third Kind mixed in DTS. Spielberg then selected DTS sound for his next film, Jurassic Park (1993). With the backing of Universal Pictures and its then-corporate parent Matsushita Electric, over 1,000 theatres in the United States adopted the DTS system.

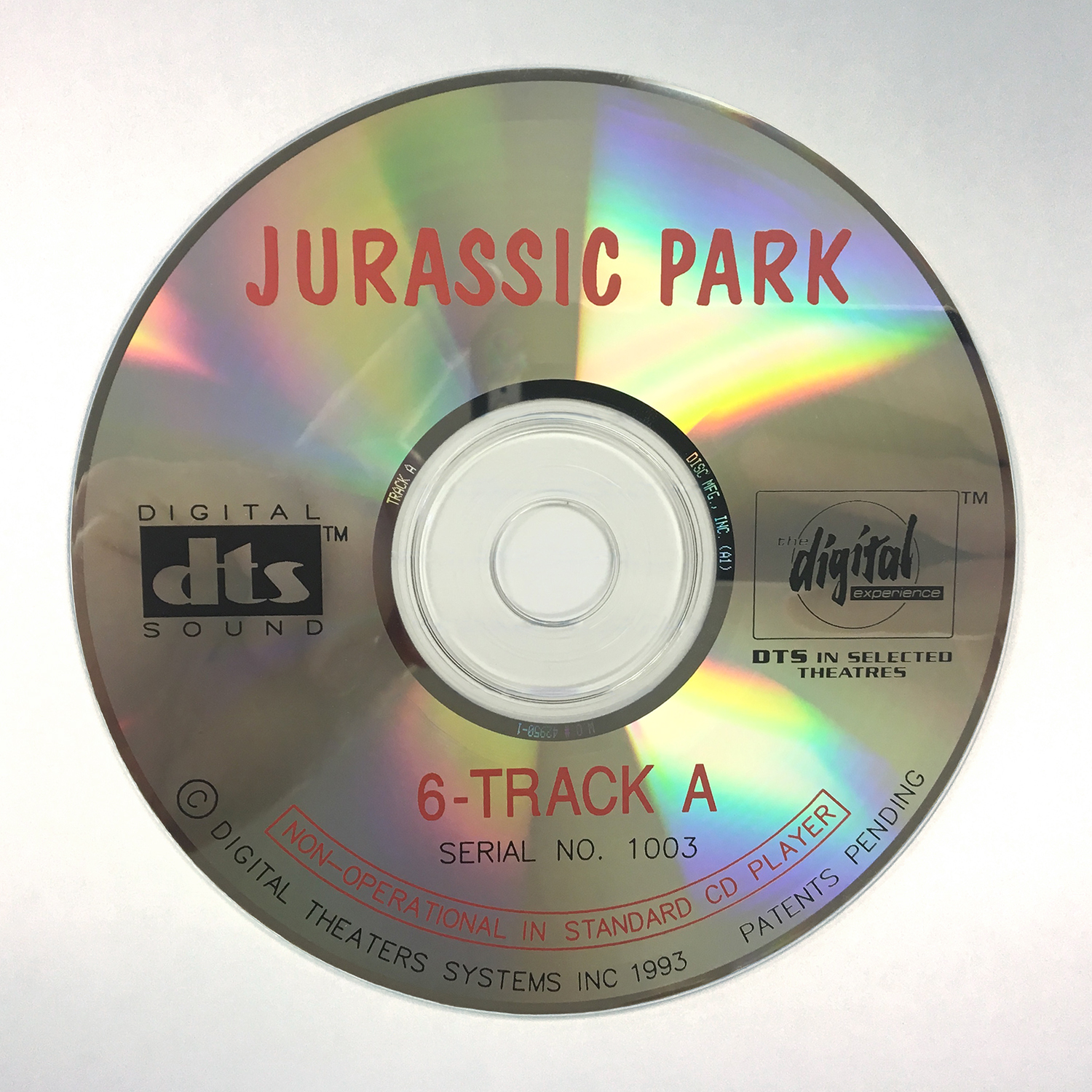
A DTS CD-ROM disc used for the original 1993 theatrical release of Jurassic Park

Work on the new audio format started in 1991, four years after Dolby Laboratories started work on its new codec, Dolby Digital.

The basic and most common version of the format is a 5.1-channel system. This is similar to a Dolby Digital setup, which encodes the audio as five primary (full-range) channels plus a special LFE (low-frequency effects) channel for the subwoofer.

Encoders and decoders support numerous channel combinations, and stereo, four-channel, and four-channel+LFE soundtracks have been released commercially on DVD, compact disc, and LaserDisc.

Other, newer DTS variants are also available, including versions that support up to seven primary audio channels plus one LFE channel (DTS-ES). These variants are generally based on DTS's core-and-extension philosophy, in which a core DTS data stream is augmented with an extension stream which includes the additional data necessary for the new variant in use. The core stream can be decoded by any DTS decoder, even if it does not understand the new variant. A decoder which does understand the new variant decodes the core stream, and then modifies it according to the instructions contained in the extension stream. This method allows backward compatibility.

DTS's main competitors in multichannel theatrical audio are Dolby Digital and Sony Dynamic Digital Sound, although only Dolby Digital and DTS are used on DVDs and implemented in home theater hardware.

One of DTS Inc.'s initial investors was Steven Spielberg, who felt that theatrical sound formats up until the company's founding were no longer state of the art, and as a result were no longer optimal for use on projects where quality sound reproduction was of the utmost importance. Spielberg debuted the format with his 1993 production of Jurassic Park, which came slightly less than a full year after the official theatrical debut of Dolby Digital (Batman Returns). In addition, Jurassic Park also became the first home video release to contain DTS sound when it was released on LaserDisc in January 1997, two years after the first Dolby Digital home video release (Clear and Present Danger on LaserDisc, which debuted in January 1995). Universal Pictures would exclusively support DTS until late 1997.

In 2008, the theater division was divested to form DTS Digital Cinema. In 2009, DTS Digital Cinema was purchased by Beaufort International Group Plc. and became known as Datasat Digital Entertainment.

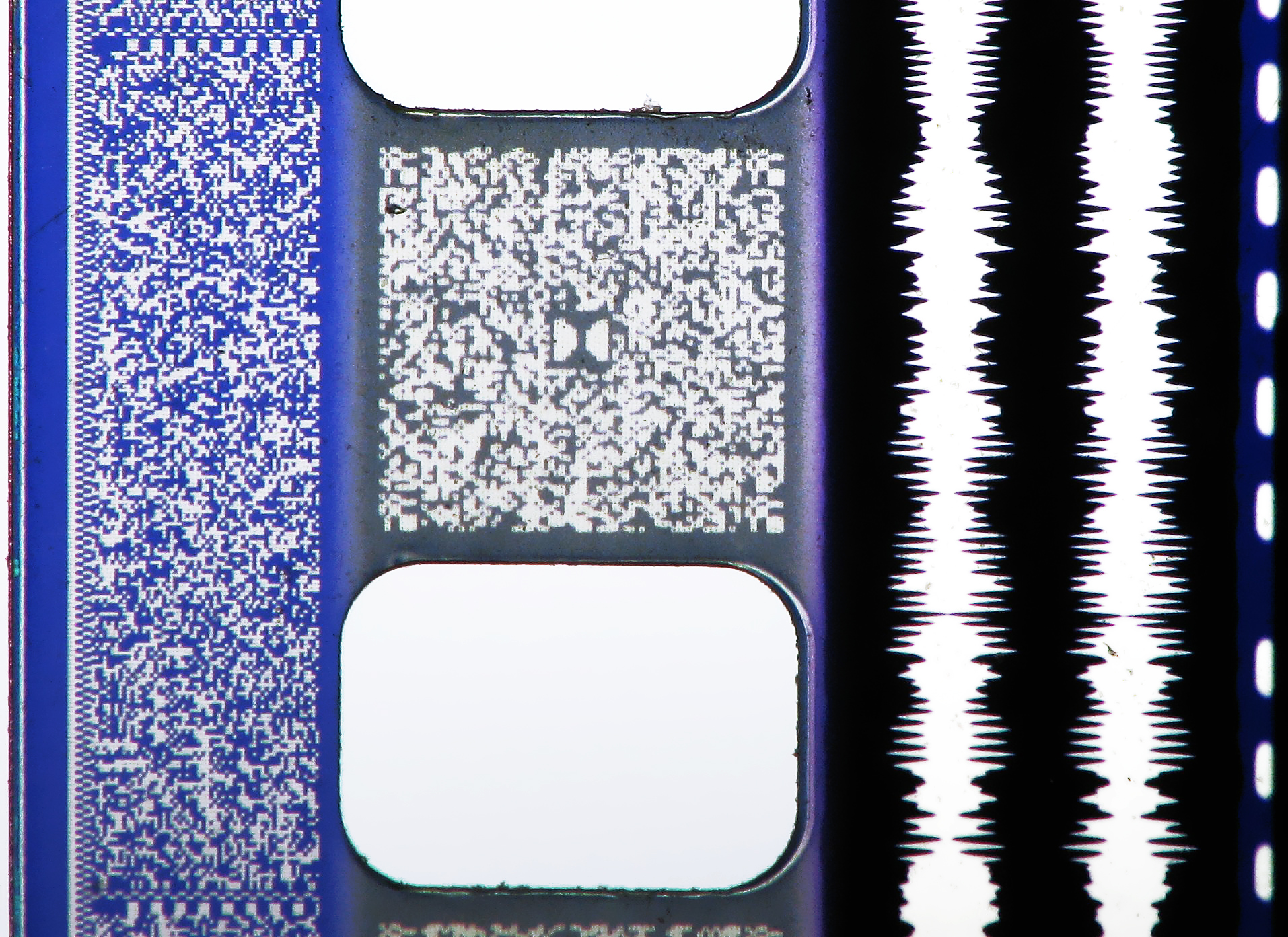
A 35 mm film print featuring all four audio formats (or "quad track"). From left to right: SDDS (blue area to the left of the sprocket holes), Dolby Digital (grey area between the sprocket holes labelled with the Dolby "Double-D" logo in the middle), analog optical sound (the two white lines to the right of the sprocket holes), and the DTS time code (the dashed line to the far right)

=== SRS Labs ===
In 2012, DTS acquired the business of SRS Labs (Sound Retrieval System), a psychoacoustic 3D audio processing technology, including over 1,000 audio patents and trademarks.

=== Manzanita Systems ===
In 2014, DTS acquired Manzanita Systems, a provider of MPEG software for digital television, VOD, and digital ad insertion.

=== Phorus ===
Phorus, a subsidiary of DTS, Inc., is a Los Angeles-based technology group dedicated to wireless audio for connected devices.

=== HD Radio (iBiquity) ===
On September 2, 2015, iBiquity announced that it was being purchased by DTS for US$172 million, uniting iBiquity's HD Radio digital radio broadcast technology with DTS' digital audio surround sound systems.

=== Theatrical use ===
In theatrical use, a proprietary 24-bit time code is optically imaged onto the film. An LED reader scans the timecode data from the film and sends it to the DTS processor, using the time code to synchronize the projected image with the DTS soundtrack audio. The multi-channel DTS audio is recorded in compressed form on standard CD-ROM media at a bitrate of 882 kbit/s. The audio compression used in the theatrical DTS system (which is very different and completely unrelated to the home Coherent Acoustics-based DTS Digital Surround format) is the APT-X100 system. Unlike the home version of DTS or any version of Dolby Digital, the APT-X100 system is fixed at a 4:1 compression ratio. Data reduction is accomplished via sub-band coding with linear prediction and adaptive quantization. The theatrical DTS processor acts as a transport mechanism, as it holds and reads the audio discs. When the DTS format was launched, it used one or two discs with later units holding three discs, thus allowing a single DTS processor to handle two-disc film soundtracks along with a third disc for theatrical trailers. The DTS time code on the 35 mm print identifies the film title which is matched to the individual DTS CD-ROMs, guaranteeing that the disc cannot be played with the wrong film. Each DTS CD-ROM contains a DOS program that the processor uses to play back the soundtrack, allowing system improvements or bug fixes to be added easily. Unlike Dolby Digital and SDDS, or the home version of DTS, the theatrical DTS system only carries five discrete channels on the CD-ROMs. The .1 LFE subwoofer track is mixed into the discrete surround channels on the disc and recovered via low-pass filters in the theater.

== DTS technologies ==
Most DTS consumer codec techniques are documented in ETSI. DTS Digital Surround, DTS-ES, DTS 96/24, and DTS-HD are recorded in ETSI TS 102 114. DTS:X is recorded in ETSI TS 103 491.

=== DTS Digital Surround ===
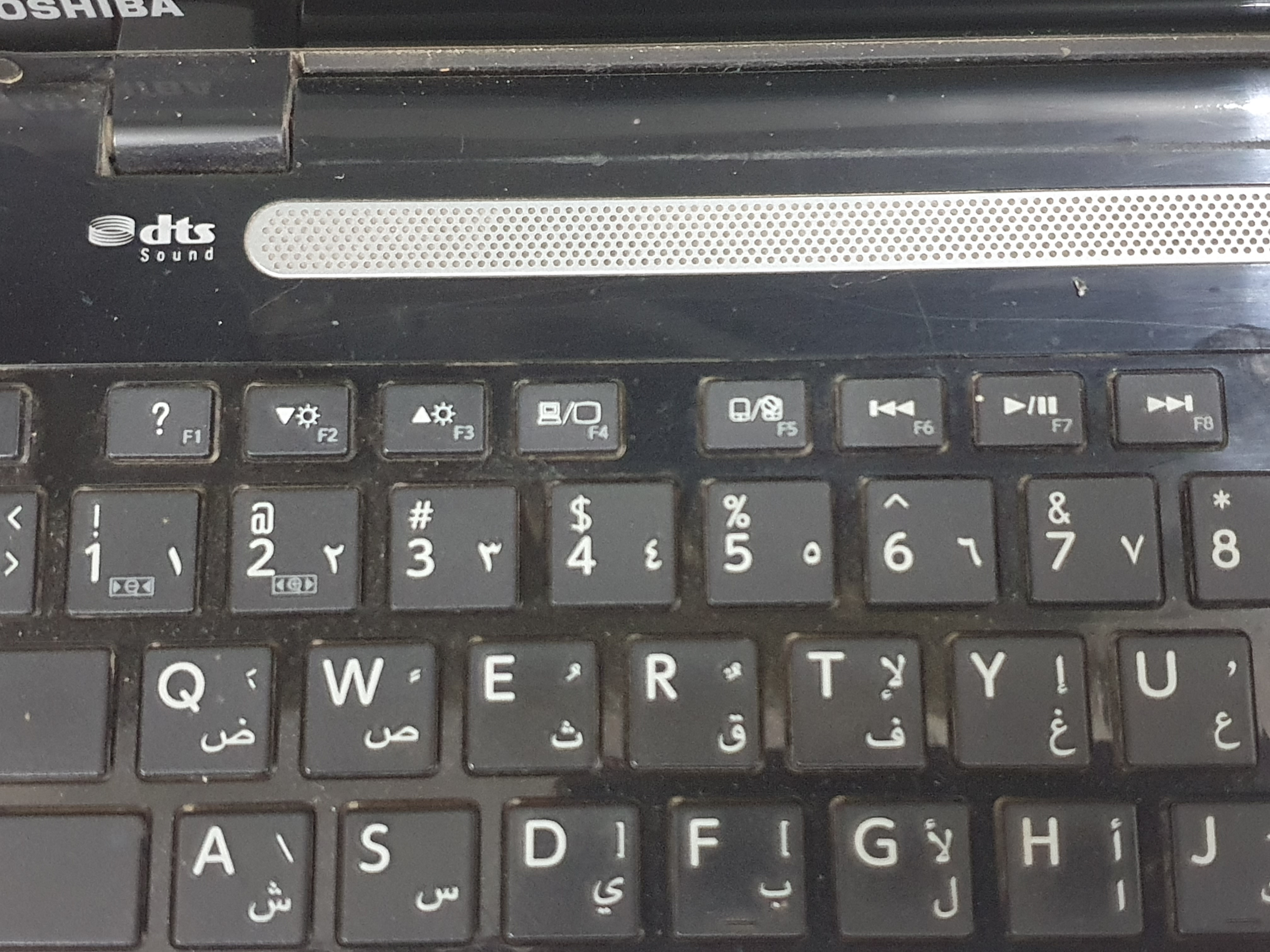
A DTS Sound logo on a compatible Toshiba Laptop

On the consumer level, DTS is the oft-used shorthand for the DTS Coherent Acoustics (DCA) codec, transportable through S/PDIF and part of the LaserDisc, DVD, and Blu-ray specifications. This system is the consumer version of the DTS standard, using a similar codec without needing separate DTS CD-ROM media.

DTS is related to the aptX audio coding format, and it is based on the adaptive differential pulse-code modulation (ADPCM) audio data compression algorithm. In contrast, Dolby Digital (AC-3) is based on the modified discrete cosine transform (MDCT) compression algorithm.

Both music and movie DVDs allow delivery of a DTS audio signal, but DTS was not part of the original DVD specification (it was added later in 1997), so early DVD players do not recognize DTS audio tracks at all. The DVD specification was revised to allow optional inclusion of DTS audio tracks. The DVD title must carry one or more primary audio tracks in AC-3 or LPCM format (in Europe, MPEG-1 Audio Layer II is also an allowed primary track format). The DTS audio track, if present, can be selected by the user. Subsequent DVD players now decode DTS natively or pass it through to an external decoder. Nearly all standalone receivers and many integrated DVD players/receivers can decode DTS.

A small number of LaserDiscs carry DTS soundtracks. The NTSC LaserDisc format allows for either analog audio only or both analog and digital audio tracks. LaserDiscs encoded with DTS sound replace the LPCM digital audio track with the DTS soundtrack. This soundtrack is output via digital coaxial or optical audio outputs and requires an external decoder to process the bitstream. Playback of DTS audio CDs, such as those marketed by DTS as 5.1 Music Discs, using a standard CD player similarly requires an external decoder. As with standard CD players, DVD and Blu-ray Disc players cannot decode audio from DTS audio CDs.

For PC playback, many software players support the decoding of DTS. The VideoLAN project has created a decoding module for DTS called libdca (formerly libdts), which is the first open source implementation of DTS.

The PlayStation 3 and Xbox 360 video game consoles are capable of DTS decoding and output via TOSLINK or HDMI as LPCM. However, HDMI output on the Xbox 360 is only found on the "Elite" model and newer models available since mid-2007, with the release of the Falcon motherboard revision. Also, the Xbox 360 cannot decode DTS from DTS audio CDs. PlayStation 3 consoles can bitstream DTS over HDMI, but cannot decode audio from DTS audio CDs. The newer "slim" models are able to bitstream DTS-HD MA as well, but also cannot decode audio from DTS CDs.

==== Comparison with Dolby Digital ====
DTS and Dolby Digital (AC-3), DTS's chief competitor in the cinema and home theater markets, are often compared because of their similarity in product goals, though Dolby believed that the surround channels should be diffused and DTS said they should be directional. In theatrical installations, AC-3 audio is placed between sprocket holes on the 35 mm film itself, leaving the audio content susceptible to physical damage from film wear and mishandling. DTS audio is stored on a separate set of CD-ROM media, with greater storage capacity that affords the potential to deliver greater audio fidelity and is not subject to the usual wear and damage suffered by the film print during the normal course of the movie's theatrical screening. Disregarding the separate CD-ROM assembly as a potential point of failure, the DTS audiopath is comparatively impervious to film degradation, unless the film-printed timecode is completely destroyed.

Dolby claims its competing AC-3 codec achieves similar transparency at its highest coded bitrate (640 kbit/s). However, in program material available to home consumers (DVD, broadcast, and subscription digital TV), neither AC-3 nor DTS typically run at their highest allowed bitrate. DVD and broadcast (ATSC) HDTV cap AC-3 bitrate at 448 kbit/s. Even at that rate, however, consumer audio gear already enjoys better audio performance than theatrical (35 mm movie) installations, in which AC-3 is limited to 320 kbit/s. When DTS audio was introduced to the DVD specification, a few studios authored DTS tracks on some DVDs at the full bitrate (1509.75 kbit/s). Most later DVD titles that offered DTS tracks were encoded at 754.5 kbit/s (about half the rate of 1509 kbit/s). At this reduced rate, DTS no longer retains audio transparency. This was done to make room for more audio tracks and content to reduce costs of spreading extra material on multiple discs.

Dolby Digital 5.1 can compress the same data to less, taking up minimal space. Conversely, DTS proponents claim that the extra bits give higher fidelity and more dynamic range, providing a richer and more lifelike sound. But no conclusion can be drawn from their respective bitrates, as each codec relies on different coding tools and syntax to compress audio.

In addition to the standard 5.1-channel DTS Surround codec, the company has several other technologies in its product range designed to compete with similar systems from Dolby. Those which conceptually extend DTS (to add more channels or more accurate sound reproduction) are implemented as extensions to a core DTS Coherent Acoustics data stream. The core stream is compatible with DTS decoders which do not support the extension(s); the extension(s) provide the additional data required to implement the additional functionality.

=== DTS 70 mm ===
DTS 70 mm is a process designed specifically for playback in motion picture theaters equipped with 70 mm film projection and 6-track surround sound. The 70 mm DTS prints do not have 6-track magnetic striping, so there is no analog backup should the digital sound fail. The time code track on the film is significantly wider than the 35 mm version, since it can occupy the area formerly taken up by a magnetic track. Theaters with 70 mm DTS frequently install two time code readers for greater reliability.

The gradual disappearance of 70 mm as a common exhibition format has led to DTS-70 being reserved for niche engagements of 70 mm revivals and restorations. Dolby Digital has not been adapted to the 70 mm format.

=== DTS-ES ===
DTS-ES (DTS Extended Surround) was introduced in theaters in March 1999. and in June 2000 for home theaters It includes two variants, DTS-ES Discrete 6.1 and DTS-ES Matrix 5.1, depending on how the sound was originally mastered and produced originally. Many DTS-ES 6.1 Discrete tracks are simply remastered from DTS 5.1, where both surround channels are split up to add new center surround channel as well, which is similar to the DTS-ES 5.1 Matrix's goal, which can upmix to 6.1. This differs with the DTS-ES Matrix, as it is a 5.1 in discrete channels, and is a matrixed/upmixed format for use with non-6.1 content, which is not unlike the DTS Neo:6. The DTS Neo:6, however, are usually upmixing stereo-content and not discrete channels into a 5.1 matrix sound setup.

The newer DTS Neo:X formats, using DTS proprietary upmixer, DTS Neural:X, is used in all formats having the suffix ":X", allowing DTS Neo:X to matrix up to an 11.1 setup - more commonly set up as 7 1.4. Therefore, like other more modernized DTS formats such as DTS:X, can be played back on older DTS compatible equipment because of the backwards compatibility DTS offer through its use of extensions. This backwards compatibility is present in all of the later and modern formats considered extensions.

DTS-ES Matrix 5.1 is provided with 6 they are simply added as an extra channel, with content disc as into a 7-channel format by adding extensions in DTS Core.

DTS-ES Discrete provides 6.1 discrete channels, with a discrete, mastered and recorded (non-matrixed) center-surround channel; in home theater systems with a 7.1 configuration, the two rear-center speakers play in mono, as does other decoders like the Creative DDTS-100 (a standalone 7.1 channel decoder which includes support for up to 6.1 when paired with the GigaWorks S750 7.1 surround sound system). A switch to make all the speakers work on the system, either 5.1->7.1 or 6.1->7.1 as no discrete formats for 7.1 was included.

To maintain compatibility with DTS decoders which do not support DTS-ES, the center-surround channel is also matrixed into the left and right surround channels, so that the rear center channel's sound is still present when played in 5.1 on non-6.1 systems; an ES decoder removes the matrixed audio from these two channels when playing back DTS-ES Discrete soundtracks. DTS-ES Discrete is sometimes notated as DTS-ES 6.1. Only a few DVD titles have been released with DTS-ES Discrete, due to the fast transition from 6.1 to 7.1 setups and technology.

In contrast, Dolby's competing EX codec, which also boasts a center rear channel, can only handle matrixed data and does not support a discrete sixth speaker channel; it is most directly comparable to DTS-ES Matrix 5.1.

The center-rear/surround channel is encoded and decoded in exactly the same way as the center-front. The center-surround channel can be decoded using any surround sound processor by feeding the left and right surround signals to the processor inputs. The left-center-right surround is produced. This will work for a "center-surround" reproduction, whether the source material is explicitly encoded, as in DTS-ES, or hidden as the ambience in any 5.1 sources, including DTS-ES 5.1 and Dolby Digital Surround EX 5.1.

=== DTS 96/24 ===
DTS 96/24, introduced in May 2001, allows the delivery of 5.1 channels of 24-bit, 96 kHz audio and high quality video on DVD-Video format. Prior to the development of DTS 96/24, it was only possible to deliver two channels of 24-bit, 96 kHz audio on DVD Video. DTS 96/24 can also be placed in the video zone on DVD-Audio discs, making these discs playable on all DTS-compatible DVD players. DTS 96/24 is implemented as a core DTS stream plus an extension containing the deltas to enable 96/24 sound reproduction.

=== DTS-HD High Resolution Audio ===
DTS-HD High Resolution Audio, along with DTS-HD Master Audio, comprise the DTS-HD extension to the original DTS audio format. It delivers up to 7.1 channels of sound at up to 96 kHz sampling frequency and 24-bit depth resolution. DTS-HD High Resolution Audio is selected as an optional surround sound format for Blu-ray and HD DVD, with constant bit rates up to 6.0 Mbit/s and 3.0 Mbit/s, respectively. It is intended to be an alternative for DTS-HD Master Audio where disc space may not allow it. DTS-HD High Resolution Audio is implemented as a core DTS stream plus an extension containing the two additional channels plus details to enable 96/24 sound reproduction.

=== DTS-HD Master Audio ===
DTS-HD Master Audio, formerly known as DTS++, is the second of two DTS-HD audio formats. It supports a virtually unlimited number of surround sound channels, can deliver audio quality at bit rates extending from lossless (24-bit, 192 kHz) down to DTS Digital Surround and, like Neo, downmix to 5.1 or 2.1 systems.

DTS-HD Master Audio is selected as an optional surround sound format for Blu-ray, where it has been limited to a maximum of 8 discrete channels. DTS-HD MA supports variable bit rates up to 24.5 Mbit/s, with up to 6 channels encoded at up to 192 kHz or 8 channels and nine objects encoded at 96 kHz/24 bit. If more than two channels are used, a "channel remapping" function allows for remixing the soundtrack to compensate for a different channel layout in the playback system compared to the original mix.

All Blu-ray players can decode the DTS "core" resolution soundtrack at 1.5 Mbit/s, however, as DTS-HD Master Audio is also implemented as a standard DTS core plus extensions, but cannot decode audio from DTS audio CDs. DTS-HD Master Audio and Dolby TrueHD are the only technologies that deliver compressed lossless surround sound for these disc formats. (DTS Coherent Acoustics' coding system was selected as mandatory audio technology for Blu-ray Discs.)

=== DTS:X ===
For each speaker, DTS:X allows the "location" (direction from the listener) of "objects" (audio tracks) to be specified as polar coordinates. The audio processor is then responsible for dynamically rendering sound output depending on the number and position of speakers available. Dolby Atmos uses a similar technique, although the speaker layout employed by cinema DTS:X is the sum of Dolby Atmos and Auro-3D. The layout showcased at AMC Burbank theater number 8 has a standard eight-channel base layer, a five-channel height layer on top of the base layer (on the front and side walls) and three rows of speakers on the ceiling. The surround arrays are bass managed by woofers suspended from the ceiling. The first public demonstration was performed at CES 2015 on a Trinnov Altitude32 processor.

A follow-up, non-consumer-focused format known as DTS:X Pro, usually supported by many consumer receivers anyway, supports up to 32 channels of audio, effectively making the aforementioned setup a DTS:X Pro setup. There are no other differences than the added support for more channels, nor does it exist a Pro-variant of a DTS:X soundtrack; it is merely for convenience in large cinemas.

=== DTS Neo:6 ===
DTS Neo:6, like Dolby's Pro Logic IIx system, reconstructs 2.1, 5.1, 6.1, or 7.1 sources to 3.1, 4.1, 5.1, 6.1, and 7.1 channel systems. A 7.1 system's 2 rear speakers are mono. Neo:6 is a multi-band decoder, unlike Dolby Pro Logic II's broadband logic steering, meaning the decoder can enhance more than one predominant signal at a time — provided each predominant signal lies in a different frequency band than the others. The number of bands steered varies in each Neo:6 implementation, with the first decoders steering in 12 separate bands and later units steering up to 19.

=== DTS Neo:X ===
DTS Neo:X reconstructs 2.1, 5.1, 6.1, or 7.1 sources to 11.1 front height and width channel systems. Dolby's Pro Logic IIz's system adds only front height channels to the 7.1 configuration. Neo:X also matrix downmixes 11.1 sources to 5.1 or 7.1 channel systems.

=== DTS Neural:X ===
DTS Neural:X, like Dolby Surround, is an upmixing technique to serve legacy bitstreams and PCM content by upmixing or remapping them to virtually any speaker layout (in which the sound can come from anywhere around the listener, including above). It is complementary to the DTS:X system, allowing the full use of a DTS:X speaker layout when the content has not been encoded for it or exceeds the number of supported channels in DTS:X, effectively being exactly what a DTS:X Pro setup consists of with support for 32 channels (via Neural:X, the spatial audio remapping engine ad opposed to a format contrary to popular belief.) .

=== DTS Virtual:X ===
DTS Virtual:X creates "phantom" surround or height speakers using psychoacoustic processing of existing soundtracks (including the creation of height channels if needed) to allow systems with a reduced number of physical speakers (such as TV soundbars) to provide a more "immersive" experience.

=== DTS Surround Sensation ===
DTS Surround Sensation: Formerly known as DTS Virtual. It allows a virtual 5.1 surround sound to be heard through a standard pair of headphones.

=== DTS Headphone:X ===
DTS Headphone:X is a spatial audio technology, sometimes referred to as DTS Headphone:X "v2.0" or even "v2.0 7.1", if the technology is to be licensed out to companies and not implemented by DTS themselves (through first-party applications such as DTS Sound Unbound and others), where usually on non-PC devices such as video game consoles can still provide the technology, using multi-channel Dolby Digital bitstreams, usually over a separate optical SPD/F that contain metadata which is then processed by an external headphone decoder, as seen in the Arctis Pro headphone variants by SteelSeries, and several other companies like headphone systems by Turtle Beach with the Elite2+SuperAmp combination, specifically the one for PlayStation and not Xbox, as in Xbox there is the potential for using the Windows Spatial Audio API which can be set up in apps like DTS Sound Unbound, avoiding the original audio format to be processed by a dedicated device, to get the effects of spatial audio through the use of sound objects rather than channels, and placing them where they would naturally occur in a 3D space, but is also compatible with stereo PCM tracks, and can be encoded on top of a 2-channel lossy DTS bitstream that reproduces 12 channels of spatial audio, sometimes called surround sound, using Head-related transfer function to allow for any pair of stereo headphones to be used. However, in the Windows and Xbox versions of the technology, there exists almost 600 pre-made presets (by DTS) for different headphone models or earbuds, tuned specifically for the purpose of DTS Headphone:X .

The head related transfer function algorithm used here is developed by DTS and includes compensation for room cues such as reflection and delay by mapping the acoustic characteristic of the original mixing studio, or other professional audio techniques such as dynamic room correction, loudness equation, and a 360° sense of sound, like "Dolby Atmos for Headphones" as a very close reference and its main competitor.

=== DTS Connect ===
DTS Connect is a blanket name for a two-part system used on the computer platform only, in order to convert PC audio into the DTS format, transported via a single S/PDIF cable. The two components of the system are DTS Interactive and DTS Neo:PC. It is found on various CMedia soundcards and onboard audio with Realtek ALC883DTS/ALC889A/ALC888DD-GR/ALC892-DTS-CG and SoundMAX AD1988 chips, as well as several cards based on the X-Fi chipset, such as the SoundBlaster Titanium series and Auzentech's X-Fi Forte, X-Fi Prelude, X-Fi Home Theater HD and X-Fi Bravura cards.

- DTS Interactive: This is a real-time DTS stream encoder. On the PC, it takes multichannel audio and converts it into a 1.5 Mbit/s DTS stream for output. Because it uses the original DTS codec to transmit audio, fidelity is limited to 5.1 channel at 48 kHz, 24bit. More than 5.1 channels, a higher sampling frequency or data rate are not supported, due to the lack of support for DTS variants such as DTS 96/24. It can also be found on some standalone devices (e.g. Surround Encoder). Nearly a dozen titles on the PlayStation 2 feature the "DTS Interactive" real-time stream encoder, such as Grand Theft Auto: Vice City and Terminator 3: Rise of the Machines.
- DTS Neo:PC: This is a technology based on the DTS Neo:6 matrix surround technology, which transforms any stereo content (MP3, WMA, CD Audio, or games) into a simulated 7.1-channel surround sound experience. The 7.1-channel surround sound is output as a DTS stream for output via a S/PDIF cable port.

== DTS Play-Fi ==
Play-Fi is a wireless protocol for multi-room audio based on the existing 802.11 specification (b/g/n). It debuted in late 2012 as an Android streaming protocol, gaining iOS support in September 2013, and later added Windows support, including audio/video sync. The first Play-Fi speaker was the Phorus PS1, made by DTS subsidiary Phorus.

Unlike competitors such as Sonos or SoundTouch from Bose, Play-Fi is an open standard and has been adopted by a wide range of brands including Anthem, Arcam, Audiolab, Definitive Technology, Hewlett-Packard, Integra, Klipsch, MartinLogan, McIntosh, Onkyo, Paradigm, Philips, Pioneer, Polk Audio, Rotel, Sonus Faber, Soundcast and Wren. The Play-Fi app supports streaming from the user's device, DLNA servers, via AirPlay and from online streaming services including Spotify, Pandora Radio, Amazon Prime Music, iHeart Radio, Rhapsody, SiriusXM, Tidal, Qobuz, KKBox, QQ Music, and Juke. DTS Play-Fi also introduced a Play-Fi enabled wireless speaker with Amazon Alexa Voice Services built-in under the Onkyo, Phorus, and Pioneer brands in September 2017.

Other Play-Fi capabilities include:

- grouping speakers for individual simultaneous playback of the same source and so that their volume can be controlled simultaneously
- grouping speakers in stereo or surround configurations
- creating zones for playing different audio streams to different groups of speakers
- streaming line-in input to a speaker group
- streaming of arbitrary audio output on computers running Windows or Linux with PulseAudio (albeit with a delay and only to individual speakers, as opposed to groups, zones, or stereo configurations)
- streaming the left and right surround channels of a broadcast or movie to two wireless Play-Fi speakers to be used as surround channels with a Play-Fi enabled sound bar.
- Ability to stream and decode high resolution audio (up to 96 kHz / 24-bit).

Play-Fi does not support Google Cast, re-transmitting Bluetooth input to more than one speaker, or audio streaming in sync with video on non-Windows systems.

== See also ==
- AV receiver
- Codec
- Dolby Digital (AC-3)
- Dolby
- Home cinema
- THX
