= XFi =

XFi, X-Fi or XFI may refer to:

- Sound Blaster X-Fi, a line of PC sound cards from Creative Technology
- xFi Advanced Gateway, an Xfinity WiFi router
- Xfi Centre for Finance and Investment, a research and teaching institute at the University of Exeter
- XFI, the electrical circuit standard for chip-to-chip connection in an XFP transceiver
