= Yamaha DSP-1 =

The Yamaha DSP-1 is a processor of early home theater surround sound equipment, produced in 1986. The DSP-1 (referred to by Yamaha as a Digital Soundfield Processor) allowed owners to synthesize up to 6-channels of surround sound from 2 channel stereo sound via a complex digital signal processor (DSP). Much like today's home theater receivers the DSP-1 offered sixteen "sound fields" created through the DSP including a jazz club, a cathedral, a concert hall, and a stadium. However, unlike today's integrated amps and receivers, these soundfield modes were highly editable, allowing the owner to customize the effect to his or her own personal taste. The DSP-1 also included an analog Dolby Surround decoder as well as other effects such as real-time echo and pitch change.

Most of the DSP-1's controls are on the unit's remote control. The reason, as mentioned in the manual, being that it was felt that adjustments should be done at the listening position. This can make it difficult for collectors to find a complete functioning unit, although there is at least one provider of aftermarket remote controls with duplicate programming for the DSP-1 if needed. In Dolby Surround mode, only 4 channels are active, with just the front main channels and rear surround channels operating, the forward surround channels being muted.

Yamaha has kept the DSP prefix for many of its home DSP and audio amp/receiver products.

== See also ==
- AMD TrueAudio
- E-mu 20K
