= AMD TrueAudio =

AMD's application-specific integrated circuit

- Design firm: Advanced Micro Devices
- Introduced: October 2013
- Type: Audio acceleration

AMD TrueAudio is a kind of audio co-processor.

Block diagram of HiFi Audio Engine DSP, which TrueAudio is based on. Shows the 56-bit wide MAC unit.

TrueAudio is AMD's application-specific integrated circuit (ASIC) intended to serve as dedicated co-processor for the calculations of computationally expensive advanced audio signal processing, such as convolution reverberation effects and 3D audio effects. TrueAudio is integrated into some of the AMD GPUs and APUs available since 2013.

== Overview ==
TrueAudio is a DSP for audio based on Cadence Tensilica HiFi EP DSP with Tensilica Xtensa SP float support.

AMD claimed that a few simple audio effects can use up to 14% of the CPU. Audiokinetic claimed that it is up to 10%. Independent software vendors (ISV), such as game developers, can use what is called a Wwise audio plugin to offload such computations to the TrueAudio DSPs. The on-die TrueAudio DSPs provide a better "silicon area to computing power" ratio and "power consumption to computing power" ratio for audio processing than the CPU, effectively making it an audio acceleration unit.

On 18 March 2014, AnandTech evaluated AMD TrueAudio using the Thief video game.

=== True Audio Next ===
A new version of TrueAudio, TrueAudio Next, was released with the Radeon RX 400 series GPUs in 2016. TrueAudio Next utilizes the GPU to simulate audio physics. The move from a dedicated DSP to GPGPU breaks compatibility with the previous TrueAudio implementation. The TrueAudio Next SDK was released as open source through AMD's GPUOpen suite in August 2016. It also clarified that TrueAudio Next uses the GPU's ray-casting technology to do the audio computation, and can also reserve GCN compute units for lower latency.

== Software support ==
Interfaces involved when offloading computations to AMD TrueAudio. Sound cards, AC'97/HDA-codec chips or audio over HDMI/DisplayPort are not affected. Neither are A3D, EAX or OpenAL.

Support for the AMD TrueAudio ASIC is contained in the Linux kernel device driver amdgpu.

AMD TrueAudio enables dedicated digital signal processing (DSP). Such dedicated audio processing horsepower is specifically for generating immersive soundscapes and saves CPU cycles that can be used for other game processing tasks such as AI and Physics.

The video games Murdered: Soul Suspect, Star Citizen, Thief and Lichdom: Battlemage (uses CryEngine) can be configured to use AMD TrueAudio if present.

There is an audio plug-in for Audiokinetic's Wwise (Wave Works Interactive Sound Engine) to off-load computation to the TrueAudio DSP(s). Wwise is available for Linux, OS X, Windows, PlayStation 4, Xbox One et al.

GenAudio's AstoundSound, a highly optimized collection of advanced DSP C/C++ software available as a library or a plugin for augmenting real-time audio engines on Linux, OS X, Windows as well as Android and iOS, can make use of AMD TrueAudio. AstoundSound is also wrapped for several plug-in formats, such as RTAS and Wwise and has been integrated into several DSP chips. AstoundSound is described as fully programmable audio engine.

Support for True Audio Next was added to the Steam Audio API in February 2018. The latest version was updated Nov 2022, and includes support for Unity, Unreal, and FMOD.

== Driver support ==
AMD has retired the original AMD TrueAudio Technology support from Radeon Software Crimson Edition 16.40, and introduced a new way for developers to support AMD TrueAudio Technology like features with AMD TrueAudio Next. There is a beta cross-platform support since end of 2019 and in 2021 it's still a pull request but now this branch configured as default and compiles on Windows, Linux, and MacOS using CMake.

== Availability ==
AMD TrueAudio is found on-die of select AMD graphics cards and APUs. A die can house multiple AMD TrueAudio DSP cores, each having 32KiB instruction and data caches and 8KiB of scratchpad memory for local operation.

AMD TrueAudio SIP blocks are found on the dies of some GPUs of the AMD Radeon Rx 200 Series; namely the Radeon R7 260, Radeon R7 260X, Radeon R9 285, Radeon R9 290, Radeon R9 290X and the Radeon R9 295X2, and in Kaveri and Carrizo-based APUs. TrueAudio is also supported by the PlayStation 4 hardware.

An I²S solution is also supported for SOCs.

AMD True Audio Next is supported on RX 5000, 6000, and 7000 series GPUs.

== See also ==
- Advanced Linux Sound Architecture – the Linux kernel sound subsystem
- E-mu 20K – the DSP found in Sound Blaster X-Fi sound cards
- SoundStorm – Nvidia audio hardware in nForce motherboard chipsets
- Aureal Vortex – dedicated chip for computation of audio effects
- Yamaha DSP-1
- FMOD – middleware for audio

=== Other AMD SIP blocks ===
- Unified Video Decoder
- Video Coding Engine
