= Conservatory of Recording Arts and Sciences =

For-profit technical school in Arizona, U.S.

- Motto: Cras people make it
- Type: Private for-profit technical school
- Established: 1988
- Students: 619 (2018)
- Location: Tempe, Arizona, United States
- Website: cras.edu

The Conservatory of Recording Arts and Sciences (informally Cras) is an American private for-profit technical school specializing in audio recording, audio engineering and production education with its main location in Tempe, Arizona and a satellite campus in Gilbert, Arizona. It is accredited by the Accrediting Commission of Career Schools and Colleges and approved by the Arizona State Board of Private Postsecondary Education.

== History ==
First established in New York, in 1980 a 24-track recording studio called Songshop offered adult training classes to novices as well as record label personnel. These classes proved to be very popular, and the increasing demand for training and hands-on experience necessitated expansion of the program to include internships with commercial studios and recording artists.

In 1987 the entire enterprise moved to Tempe and the name was changed to The Academy of Recording Sciences. As the reputation of the institution gained prominence in the music recording industry, the name was again changed in 1988 to the Conservatory of Recording Arts and Sciences, as this more appropriately reflected the nature of the institution – “to conserve, enhance, improve and promote the artistic and technical skills of audio recording by preparing students to enter the business as qualified audio recording engineers.”

In 2000, a satellite Location was opened in Gilbert allowing the school to accept more students and create a large live sound room to teach within.

Out of the total 83 categories at the Grammys in February 2016, 47 different alumni have contributed to pieces that were nominated in 42 different Grammy categories.

== Facilities ==
The Conservatory of Recording Arts and Sciences has two campuses, the main campus located in Tempe and a satellite campus located in Gilbert. The Tempe location hosts eight classrooms along with state of the art equipment such as a Solid State Logic 4000 console, SSL Origin console, and API legacy console alongside an AVID S6 console set up for Post Production and Atmos/Surround Sound mixing.

The satellite campus located in Gilbert hosts nine classrooms as well as a mobile broadcast unit and 6,000 sq ft (560 m^{2}) live sound venue. It has much of the same equipment as the Tempe location such as a Solid State Logic 4000 console, SSL Origin console, and API legacy console alongside an AVID S6 for post production and Atmos work.

== Academics ==
The School is accredited by the Accrediting Commission of Career Schools and Colleges and the Arizona State Board of Private Postsecondary Education to offer degrees in audio. The school is approved to teach veterans by United States Department of Veterans Affairs and the Arizona Department of Veterans' Services

The school offers a degree in recording after an 11-month program and internship as well as 16 certifications in software. Certifications include 6 Pro Tools certifications, focusrite Rednet, Celemony Melodyne, L'Acoustics Soundvision, TC Electronic M3000, TC Electronic System S6000, Waves, Wwise, Midas M32, Apple Logic Pro X, Antares Auto-tune Pro, and Rational Acoustics Smaart.

The school is a Avid Pro Tools Curricular partner. It also has its own AES chapter

== Noteworthy staff ==
Since 1992, Robert Brock has worked at the Conservatory of Recording Arts and Sciences During that time he has led the development of manufacturer training and certification websites for Studer Vista series digital audio consoles and Audiokinetic's Wwise game audio integration software, contributed articles to audio trade magazines and has contributed in both editorial and authorship roles for the Logic and Soundtrack Pro Apple Pro Training Series books published by Peachpit Press. In 2009 Brock was honored by being selected as an ADE (Apple Distinguished Educator) and served on the ADE advisory board for five years. In 2020 he helped design the artificial crowd noise for many NFL stadiums including the New England Patriots.
