= Auzentech =

Auzentech, Inc.
- Type: Public
- Industry: Consumer Electronics
- Founded: 2005; 21 years ago
- Founder: Stephane Bae
- Headquarters: United States, Japan, South Korea, Silicon Valley, California, United States of America
- Key people: Stephane Bae, (President)
- Products: Multimedia, IT, Consumer electronics
- Website: www.auzentech.com

Auzentech, Inc. was a Korean computer hardware manufacturer that specialized in high-definition audio equipment and in particular PC sound cards.

Auzentech has its origins in March 2005, when under the company name HDA (HiTeC Digital Audio), the company launched the X-Mystique 7.1, the first consumer add-in sound card to feature Dolby Digital Live. Initially only a manufacturer, HDA's products were commercialized worldwide by a network of local distributors, including BlueGears as their vendor in the United States.

In 2006, the company took distribution into their own hands, ceasing relations with BlueGears, and subsequently changing their brand name to Auzen (a name which originates from "Audio" and "Zen") and their company name to Auzentech.

Since that time the company continued to incorporate new sound cards into their lineup in an effort to compete in a market dominated by Creative Labs. Auzentech sought to provide customers with features not present in Creative's sound cards at that time, such as real time multi-channel audio encoding and built-in TOSLINK connections. These features enable users to have multichannel realtime audio (like that originating in PC games) over a single digital line, instead of the previously unavoidable three analog lines running from the PC to the speakers. Also present in all Auzentech sound cards are user-replaceable opamps, which offer the possibility to further improve the out-of-the-box quality of analog outputs.

Eventually expansion led Auzentech to broaden their range of products to include items such as speakers, microphones and PC cases among others.

Auzentech has recently switched from the C-Media audio processors used in their earlier cards to the X-Fi audio DSP, licensed from their competitor, Creative Labs.

Since early 2014, Auzentech's official web site has been directing to a park page, and their technical support department ceased to provide any service.

== Products ==
=== Based on C-Media chipsets ===
- X-Mystique 7.1 Gold
  Based on the CMI 8768+ chipset. Launched in June 2005. First PC consumer add-in sound card to feature Dolby Digital Live.
- X-Plosion 7.1 DTS Connect
  Based on the CMI 8770 chipset. First PC consumer sound card to feature DTS Connect certification. In June 2009, the card was re-released, with its name changed to X-Plosion 7.1 Cinema (discontinued).
- X-Meridian 7.1
  Based on the CMI 8788 chipset. Launched in February 2006, it was the first card launched with the Auzentech brand.
- X-Meridian 7.1 2G
  Based on the CMI 8788 chipset. Launched in December 2010
- X-Raider 7.1
  Based on the CMI 8768 chipset. Launched in July 2009, the X-Raider is a 24-bit, 96 kHz PCI 2.2 compliant card, supporting bus mastering modes.

=== Based on Creative Labs' X-Fi chipset ===
- X-Fi Prelude 7.1
  Launched in August 2007, the Prelude was the first time the X-Fi chip was used in a product not manufactured by Creative Labs.
- X-Fi Forte
  With all previous Auzentech sound cards being PCI cards, launched in January 2009, the Forte was Auzentech's first low-profile native PCI Express 1.1 sound card. DTS Interactive support was added through a later driver upgrade.
- X-Fi Home Theater HD
  Released in August 2009, it was the first HDMI 1.3a compliant sound card and the first Dolby TrueHD compatible sound card. PCI Express 1.1 interface. Seeking to provide the best possible performance, Auzentech and Creative Labs collaborated to modify the X-Fi processor to optimize it for operating over the PCI Express bus. The Home Theater HD was conceived to work with future video card offerings from NVIDIA, providing what NVIDIA and Auzentech call the "ultimate in audio and visual entertainment".
- X-Fi Bravura
  Launched in January 2010, the X-Fi Bravura is a PCI Express x1 card. X-Fi Bravura has 5x user replaceable OPAMPs.

=== Others ===
- X-Studio 5.1
  Launched in July 2009, alongside the X-Raider, the X-Studio is based on the VIA High Quality ICE 1723 audio processor. The card is capable of outputting 24-bit, 96 kHz audio and is presented as a PCI 2.2 card.

=== See also ===
- Op-amp swapping
