= Audiokinetic Wwise =

Software for interactive media and video games

- Original author: Audiokinetic
- Developer: Audiokinetic
- Stable release: 2023.1
- Written in: C++
- Platform: Android, iOS, Linux, Mac, PlayStation 3, PlayStation 4, PlayStation 5, PlayStation Vita, Wii, Nintendo 3DS, Wii U, Nintendo Switch, Microsoft Windows, Windows Phone 8, Xbox 360, Xbox One Xbox Series X/S
- Type: Game middleware; Game development tool; Digital audio workstation
- License: Proprietary
- Website: www.audiokinetic.com/en/wwise/overview/

Wwise (Wave Works Interactive Sound Engine) is Audiokinetic's software for interactive media and video games, available for free to non-commercial users and under license for commercial video game developers. It features an audio authoring tool and a cross-platform sound engine.

== Description ==
The Wwise authoring application uses a graphical interface to centralize all aspects of audio creation. The functionality in this interface allows sound designers to:

- Import audio files for use in video games
- Apply audio plug-in effects
- Mix in real-time
- Define game states
- Simulate audio environments
- Manage sound integration
- Apply the Windows Spatial Audio API, or Dolby Atmos.

Wwise allows for on-the-fly audio authoring directly in game. Over a local network, users can create, audition, and tweak sound effects and subtle sound behaviors while the game is being played on another host.

Wwise also includes the following components:

- Cross-platform sound engine (Wwise Authoring)
- Multichannel Creator (allows creation of multichannel audio)
- Plug-in architecture for source, effect, and source control plug-ins, part of Wwise Launcher
- SoundFrame API
- Wave Viewer (allows for sampling of WAV audio files)

== Supported operating systems ==
Wwise supports the following platforms:

- Windows
- Linux
- macOS
- iOS/tvOS
- Android
- PlayStation 4
- PlayStation 5/PlayStation VR2
- Nintendo Switch
- Xbox One
- Xbox Series X

== Adoption by video games ==
Titles which have used Audiokinetic include:

- Abzû
- Ace Combat 7: Skies Unknown
- Age of Empires: Castle Siege
- Alien: Isolation
- Aliens: Colonial Marines
- Alone in the Dark: Illumination
- America's Army: Proving Grounds
- Angry Birds Trilogy
- Anno 1800
- Ancestors: The Humankind Odyssey
- Astroneer
- A Plague Tale: Innocence
- The Amazing Spider-Man 2
- Arena of Valor
- Ashen
- Assassin's Creed IV: Black Flag
- Assassin's Creed: Freedom Cry
- Assassin's Creed Liberation HD
- Assassin's Creed: Rogue
- Assassin's Creed Unity
- Assassin's Creed Odyssey
- Assassin's Creed Valhalla
- Astral Chain
- Astroneer
- Batman: Arkham Knight
- Batman: Arkham Origins
- Batman: Arkham Origins Blackgate
- Bayonetta 2
- Bejeweled Stars
- BioShock Infinite
- BioShock Infinite: Burial at Sea
- Bleach: Brave Souls
- Borderlands 2(Vita), Borderlands: The Handsome Collection
- Borderlands 3
- Borderlands: The Pre-Sequel
- Cars 3: Driven to Win
- Child of Light
- Contagion
- Control
- Crackdown 3
- Create (video game)
- Crimson Dragon
- Cyberpunk 2077
- D4: Dark Dreams Don't Die
- Dance Central: Spotlight
- Dawngate
- Daylight
- Dead by Daylight
- Dead Nation - Apocalypse Edition
- Death Stranding
- Destiny
- Destiny 2
- Detroit: Become Human
- Deus Ex: The Fall
- Devil May Cry 5
- DiRT Rally
- Dirt Rally 2.0
- Dirty Bomb
- Disney Infinity 3.0
- Divinity: Dragon Commander
- Divinity: Original Sin
- DmC: Devil May Cry
- DOOM
- Driver: San Francisco
- Dungeon Keeper Mobile
- Dust 514
- Elite: Dangerous
- Entwined
- Europa Universalis V
- Event[0]
- F1 2013
- F1 2014
- Fable Anniversary
- Fae Farm
- Fantasia: Music Evolved
- Fates Forever
- Firefall
- Firewatch
- Fuse
- Gears 5
- Genshin Impact
- Ghost of Tsushima
- Godus
- GRID 2
- GRID: Autosport
- Gris
- Gunslinger Stratos 2
- Gwent: The Witcher Card Game
- H1Z1: Just Survive
- Halo 4
- Halo 5
- Halo: The Master Chief Collection
- Halo Wars: Definitive Edition
- Halo Wars 2
- Happy Wars
- Hello Neighbor 2
- Hi-Fi Rush
- Hitman 2
- Hunt: Showdown
- Infamous First Light
- Infamous Second Son
- Infinite Crisis
- Inside (video game)
- Insurgency: Sandstorm
- Journey to the Savage Planet
- Karmaflow
- Killer Instinct
- Killer Instinct Season 2
- Killing Floor 2
- Kinect Sports
- League of Legends
- Lichdom: Battlemage
- Life Is Strange
- Life Is Strange 2
- Little Nightmares II
- LittleBigPlanet Karting
- LocoCycle
- Lost Planet 3
- Mafia 3
- Mario + Rabbids Kingdom Battle
- Mario Strikers: Battle League
- Metal Gear Rising: Revengeance
- Metal Gear Solid V: Ground Zeroes
- Metal Gear Solid V: The Phantom Pain
- Metro: Last Light
- Microsoft Flight Simulator (2020 video game)
- Middle-earth: Shadow of Mordor
- Mobile Legends: Bang Bang
- ModNation Racers
- ModNation Racers: Road Trip
- Monster Hunter World
- Mortal Kombat 11
- Murdered: Soul Suspect
- Nether
- Nier: Automata
- No Man's Sky
- Nosgoth
- No Straight Roads
- Oddworld: New N' Tasty!
- Oddworld: Soulstorm
- Ori and the Will of the Wisps
- Outlast
- Outlast 2
- Overwatch
- Pathfinder: Kingmaker
- Payday 2
- Peggle 2
- Peggle Blast
- Plants vs. Zombies 2
- PlayerUnknown's Battlegrounds
- Powerstar Golf
- Prey
- Professional Baseball Spirits 2014
- Project Spark
- Punch-Out!! (2009 video game)
- Quantum Break
- Ratchet & Clank (2016 video game)
- Ratchet & Clank: Rift Apart
- Resident Evil 2 (2019)
- Resident Evil 3 (2020)
- Resident Evil 7: Biohazard
- Resident Evil Village
- Resident Evil Requiem
- Remember Me
- Resogun
- Ridge Racer Unbounded
- Rising Storm 2: Vietnam
- Risk of Rain 2
- Rocket League
- Rocksmith 2014
- Sackboy: A Big Adventure
- Saints Row: The Third
- Saint's Row IV
- Saint's Row IV: Re-Elected
- Saint's Row: Gat Out Of Hell
- Samurai Shodown (2019)
- ScreamRide
- Silent Hill 2 (2024 video game)
- Shadow of the Beast (2016)
- Shadow of the Tomb Raider
- Shadowrun (2007 video game)
- Shrek Forever After (video game)
- SimCity
- Skull and Bones
- Sleeping Dogs
- Sleeping Dogs: Definitive Edition
- Sonic & All-Stars Racing Transformed
- South Park: The Stick of Truth
- Spider-Man
- Spider-Man: Miles Morales
- Spider-Man: Web of Shadows
- Splatterhouse (2010 video game)
- Spyro Reignited Trilogy
- Star Fox Zero
- Star Citizen
- Starfield
- Star Wars: Jedi Fallen Order
- Stormland
- Strider
- Sunset Overdrive
- Super Bear Adventure
- Takedown: Red Sabre
- Talos Principle 2
- Team Sonic Racing
- Tekken 7
- Tengami
- Tetris Effect
- The Bureau: XCOM Declassified
- The Council
- The Elder Scrolls Online
- The Grand Tour Game
- The Legend of Korra
- The Order: 1886
- The Outer Worlds
- The Voice: I Want You
- The Witcher 3: Wild Hunt
- Thief
- Thronebreaker: The Witcher Tales
- Tom Clancy's Rainbow Six Siege
- Tom Clancy's The Division 2
- Total War: Attila
- Total War: Rome II
- Tornado Outbreak
- Trine 2: Complete Story
- Trine 3
- Tropico 6
- UFC Undisputed 3
- Ultima Forever: Quest for the Avatar
- Valiant Hearts: The Great War
- Warhammer 40,000: Space Marine
- Wattam
- Wildstar
- Wonderbook: Book of Potions
- Wonderbook: Walking with Dinosaurs
- World of Tanks
- World of Warplanes
- World of Warships
- Wreckfest
- WWE 2K14
- WWE 2K15
- Xenoblade Chronicles: Definitive Edition
- Yooka-Laylee
- Yooka-Laylee and the Impossible Lair
- Zoo Tycoon
- Zumba Fitness: World Party
- Zumba Kids

=== Commercial game engine integration ===
Wwise is intended to be compatible with proprietary and commercial engines.

- Unreal Engine 3
- Unreal Engine 4
- Unity
- Cocos2d-x
- CryEngine
- Orochi 3
- Gamebryo
- Fox Engine
- Autodesk Stingray
- Open 3D Engine (which superseded Amazon Lumberyard)

== Theatre ==
One play has used Wwise and its Interactive Music capabilities for live performance:

- Dom Duardos by Gil Vicente, co-produced by Companhia Contigo Teatro and Grupo de Mímica e Teatro Oficina Versus, with music by Pedro Macedo Camacho

== See also ==
- FMOD
- OpenAL
- Sound design
- Video game development
