= E-mu 20K =

Line of audio chips by Creative Technology

E-MU 20K is the commercial name for a line of audio chips by Creative Technology, commercially known as the Sound Blaster X-Fi chipset. The series comprises the E-MU 20K1 (CA20K1) and E-MU 20K2 (CA20K2) audio chips.

The 20K1 chip was launched in August 2005, and ever since it has been used in a variety of audio solutions from Creative, and more recently third-party manufacturers, such as Auzentech and Audiotrak.

The audio processor on X-Fi was the most powerful at its time of release, offering an extremely robust sample rate conversion (SRC) engine in addition to enhanced internal sound channel routing options and greater 3D audio enhancement capabilities. A significant portion of the audio processing unit was devoted to this resampling engine. The SRC engine was far more capable than previous Creative sound card offerings, a limitation that had been a major thorn in Creative's side. Most digital audio is sampled at 44.1 kHz, a standard no doubt related to CD-DA, while sound cards were often designed to process audio at 48 kHz. So, the 44.1 kHz audio must be resampled to 48 kHz (Creative's previous cards' DSPs operated at 48 kHz) for the audio DSP to be able to process and affect it. A poor resampling implementation introduces artifacts into the audio which can be heard, and measured as higher intermodulation distortion, within higher frequencies (generally 16 kHz and up). X-Fi's resampling engine produces a near-lossless-quality result, far exceeding any known audio card DSP available at the time of release. This functionality is used not only for simple audio playback, but for several other features of the card such as the "Crystalizer", a technology that claims to improve the clarity of digital music through digital analysis (supported by all X-Fi models, including the Xtreme Audio and X-Mod).

The X-Fi name has also been applied to cards based on the CA0106 and CA0110 chips, which belong to the previous generation Live!/Audigy series.

== Specifications ==
The 130 nm, 51 million transistors audio processor operates at 400 MHz and its computational power is estimated at 10,000 MIPS, which is about 24 times higher than the estimated performance of its predecessor – the Audigy processor. E-MU 20K features the Quartet DSP, a set of 4 identical digital signal processors interconnected with a wide ring bus.

The CA20K1 chip is a slave processor which requires a host CPU to control it. The CA20K2 adds an embedded RISC processor which controls the audio part; this configuration safeguards against the audio latency of its PCI Express interface. 20K2 also has more I/O ports, a DDR SDRAM memory interface, and a built-in Universal Audio Architecture component.

A big improvement in the X-Fi DSP over the previous Audigy design, is the complete overhaul of the resampling engine on the card. The previous Audigy cards had their DSPs locked at 48 kHz/16-bit, meaning any content that didn't match this format had to be resampled on the card in hardware, which resulted in serious intermodulation distortion. For the X-Fi, Creative completely rewrote the resampling engine and dedicated more than half of the power of the DSP to the process, resulting in a very clean resample. In addition, X-Fi on the PCI bus can operate at a frequency of 44.1 kHz, in all modes of operation of the card, and X-Fi on the PCI-E bus can operate in the "Audio Creation Mode" mode at any of the frequencies (44.1, 48, 88.2, 96 kHz), and in the modes "Game Mode" and "Entertainment Mode" are only on frequencies (88.2, 96 kHz), since disabling the frequency multiplier on X-Fi PCI-E is blocked by the manufacturer, moreover, the 88.2 kHz frequency has been removed from the Windows mixer, but is supported in ASIO and the device as a whole.

== Applications ==
=== Sound Blaster X-Fi series ===
Card	Release	SNR (dB)	Interface	Chip	RAM (MiB)	Notes
Elite Pro	Aug '05	116	PCI	EMU20K1	64	additional software included
Fatal1ty	Aug '05	109	PCI	EMU20K1	64	also known as: Fatal1ty FPS / Fatal1ty Edition / Platinum Fatal1ty Champion
Platinum	Aug '05	109	PCI	EMU20K1	2	
XtremeMusic	Aug '05	109	PCI	EMU20K1	2	
Digital Audio	Sep '05	109	PCI	EMU20K1	2	Japan-only variant of XtremeMusic, with additional jack extension.
XtremeGamer	Oct '06	109	PCI	EMU20K1	2	Low profile card (half height), replacement for XtremeMusic.
XtremeGamer Fatal1ty Pro	Oct '06	109	PCI	EMU20K1	64	Basically the original Fatal1ty/Fatal1ty Edition/Fatal1ty FPS/Platinum Fatal1ty Champion card without the I/O drive box and remote control.
XtremeGamer (OEM)	Jul '07	109	PCI	EMU20K1 and CA0112	2	Also known as SB0770/SB0772. It is an OEM version of XtremeGamer, but full-height like XtremeMusic and incorporates CA0112 chip which allows the card to work with generic UAA drivers.
Titanium Fatal1ty Champion	Jun '08	109	PCIe	EMU20K2	64	
Titanium Fatal1ty Professional	Jun '08	109	PCIe	EMU20K2	64	Basically the Titanium Fatal1ty Champion without the I/O drive box.
Titanium Professional Audio	Jun '08	109	PCIe	EMU20K2	16	Asia-only variant of X-Fi Titanium with minijack-to-2RCA cable and EMI shield.
Titanium	Sep '08	109	PCIe	EMU20K2	16	First X-Fi card for which Creative Labs made available a software-based implementation of Dolby Digital Live to allow for real-time encoding to DD 5.1 and subsequent output over the optical out port. DDL is also available for all other Titanium models.
Titanium OEM	Sep '08	109	PCIe	EMU20K2	16	As above but with OEM Chip.
Titanium HD	Mar '10	122	PCIe	EMU20K2	64	First card with THX TruStudio PC audio technology. Top quality current output Burr-Brown Advanced Segment PCM1794 DAC. First stereo-based internal Creative PCI/PCI-E sound card with gold-plated RCA out since the ISA AWE64 Gold. Only available in certain markets.

=== Third party ===
Card	Release	Signal-to-noise ratio	Chipset	RAM	Notes
Auzen X-Fi Prelude	Aug '07	*(120 dB)	CA20K1	64 MiB	High-end X-Fi product designed and marketed by Auzentech with Creative Labs' collaboration
Auzen X-Fi Forte	Jan '09	*(120 dB for Front, 114 dB for center, rear, side, woofer)	CA20K2	64 MiB	Low profile card (half-height) and PCIe support variant of Prelude, High-end X-Fi product designed and marketed by Auzentech with Creative Labs' collaboration
Auzen X-Fi Bravura	Jan '10	120 dB(1/4" Headphone Output), 114 dB(Speaker)	CA0110		High-quality variant, especially focusing on analog output, of X-Fi Xtreme Audio PCIE type and the first CA0110 based X-Fi of Auzentech.
AUDIOTRAK Prodigy 7.1e	Jul '09	112 dB	CA0110		High-quality variant of X-Fi Xtreme Audio PCIE type and the first X-Fi of AUDIOTRAK.
Auzen X-Fi HomeTheater HD	Jul '09	109 dB	CA20K2	64 MiB	High-end All-round variant of Auzentech X-Fi especially focusing on HDMI 1.3a and HD audio path-through. Software support for HD audio pass-through.
Gigabyte G1.Assassin	Mar '11	108 dB	CA20K2	128 MiB	Gaming LGA1366 XL-ATX motherboard with onboard X-Fi chip.
Gigabyte G1.Sniper	Mar '11	108 dB	CA20K2	64 MiB	Gaming LGA1366 EATX motherboard with onboard X-Fi chip.
Onkyo WAVIO SE-300PCIE	Apr '11	120 dB	CA20K2	-	Flagship product with daughter card providing 7.1 output, dedicated line in, and microphone. In addition to digital in/out, headphones, and RCA output.
Gigabyte G1.Sniper 2	Aug '11	108 dB	CA20K2	64 MiB	Gaming LGA1155 EATX motherboard with onboard X-Fi chip.
Gigabyte G1.Assassin 2	Nov '11	108 dB	CA20K2	128 MiB	Gaming LGA2011 EATX motherboard with onboard X-Fi chip.
Rocketfish RF-71SDCD	Dec '08	108 dB	CA0111		Mainstream X-Fi product designed and marketed by Rocketfish with Creative Labs' collaboration

- Auzentech mentions only the DAC's ideal theoretical SNR being 120 dB (AKM AK-4396).

== See also ==
- AMD TrueAudio
