= Microphone =

Device that converts sound into an electrical signal

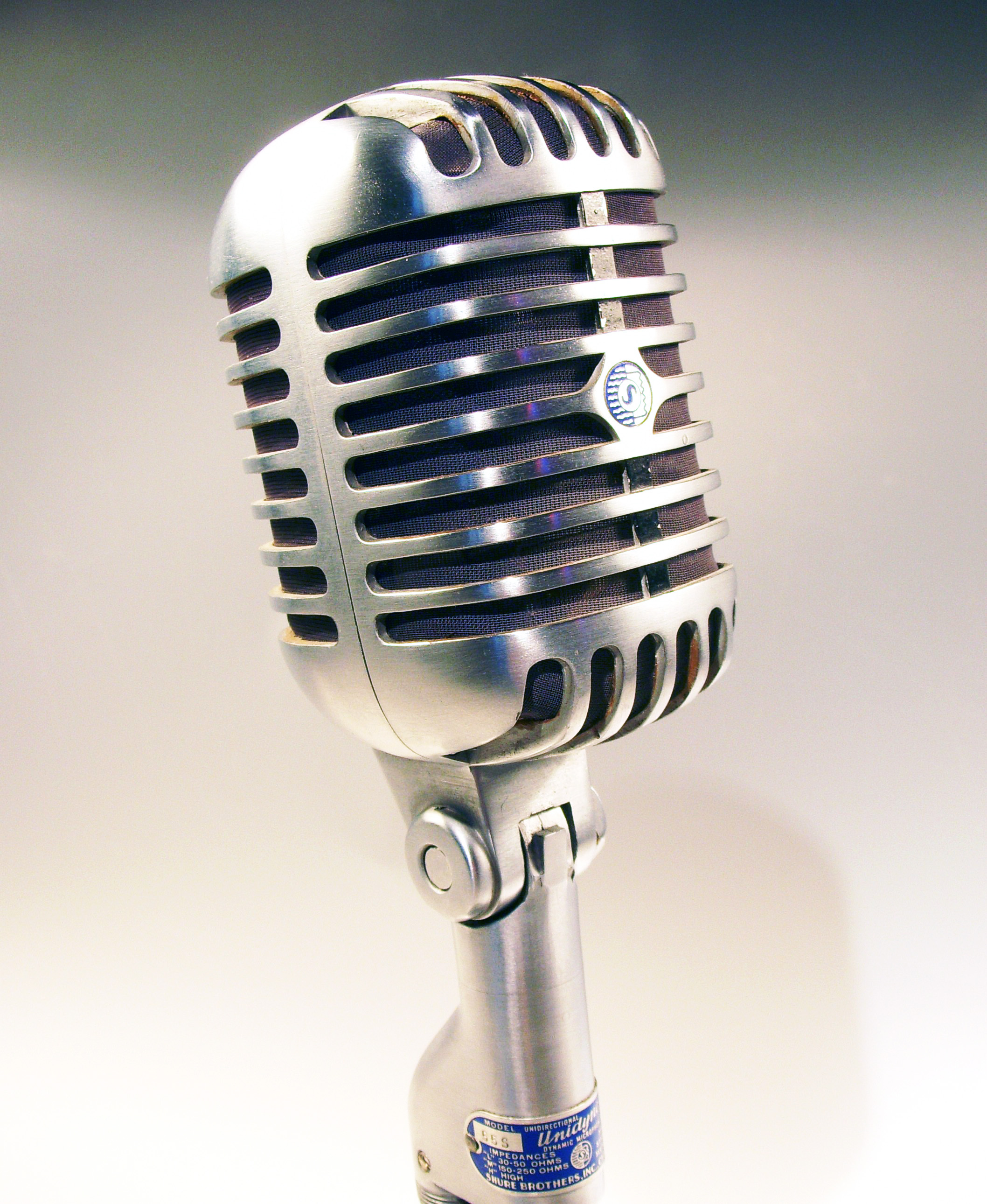
Shure Brothers microphone, model 55S, multi-impedance "Small Unidyne" dynamic from 1951

A microphone, colloquially called a mic (/maɪk/), or mike, (Note: The long-standard spelling mike, dating to the 1920s, for the abbreviated casual name—following the same orthographic principle as bike for bicycle—is now often supplanted by the newer mic, which came into use among sound engineers in the 1960s. In 2010 the Associated Press's style guide altered its standard spelling for the term from mike to mic, while retaining miked in spelling the past participle of the verb to mic/mike (rather than the ungainly miced or mic'd).) is a transducer that converts sound into an electrical signal. Microphones are used in telecommunication, sound recording, broadcasting, and consumer electronics, including telephones, hearing aids, and mobile devices.

Several types of microphone are used today, which employ different methods to convert the air pressure variations of a sound wave to an electrical signal. The most common are the dynamic microphone, which uses a coil of wire suspended in a magnetic field; the condenser microphone, which uses the vibrating diaphragm as a capacitor plate; and the contact microphone, which uses a crystal of piezoelectric material. Microphones typically need to be connected to a preamplifier before the signal can be recorded or reproduced.

== History ==
To speak to larger groups of people, a need arose to increase the volume of the human voice. The earliest devices used to achieve this were acoustic megaphones. Some of the first examples, from fifth-century-BC Greece, were theater masks with horn-shaped mouth openings that acoustically amplified the voice of actors in amphitheaters. Between 1664 and 1685, the English physicist Robert Hooke was the first to experiment with a medium other than air with the invention of an early telephone made of stretched wire with a cup attached at each end. Today, this is known as a tin-can telephone.

In 1856, Italian inventor Antonio Meucci developed a dynamic microphone based on the generation of electric current by moving a coil of wire to various depths in a magnetic field. This method of modulation was also a lasting method for the technology of the telephone. Speaking of his device, Meucci wrote in 1857, "It consists of a vibrating diaphragm and an electrified magnet with a spiral wire that wraps around it. The vibrating diaphragm alters the current of the magnet. These alterations of current, transmitted to the other end of the wire, create analogous vibrations of the receiving diaphragm and reproduce the word."

In 1861, German inventor Johann Philipp Reis built an early sound transmitter (the Reis telephone) that used a metallic strip attached to a vibrating membrane that would produce intermittent current. Better results were achieved in 1876 with the liquid transmitter design in early telephones from Alexander Graham Bell and Elisha Gray – the diaphragm was attached to a conductive rod in an acid solution. These systems, however, gave a very poor sound quality.

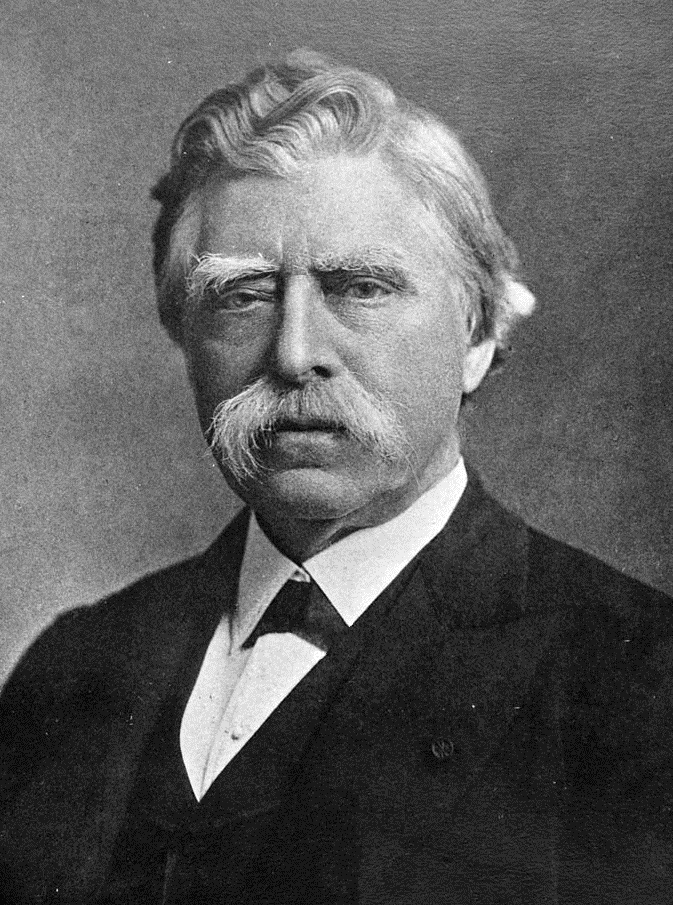
David Edward Hughes invented a carbon microphone in the 1870s.

The first microphone that enabled proper voice telephony was the (loose-contact) carbon microphone. This was independently developed by David Hughes in England and Emile Berliner and Thomas Edison in the US. Although Edison was awarded the first patent in mid-1877 (after a long legal dispute) Hughes had demonstrated his working device in front of many witnesses some years earlier and most historians credit him with its invention. The Berliner microphone found commercial success through the use by Alexander Graham Bell for his telephone and Berliner became employed by Bell. The carbon microphone was critical in the development of telephony, broadcasting and the recording industries. Thomas Edison refined the carbon microphone into his carbon-button transmitter of 1886. This microphone was employed at the first radio broadcast, a performance at the New York Metropolitan Opera House in 1910.

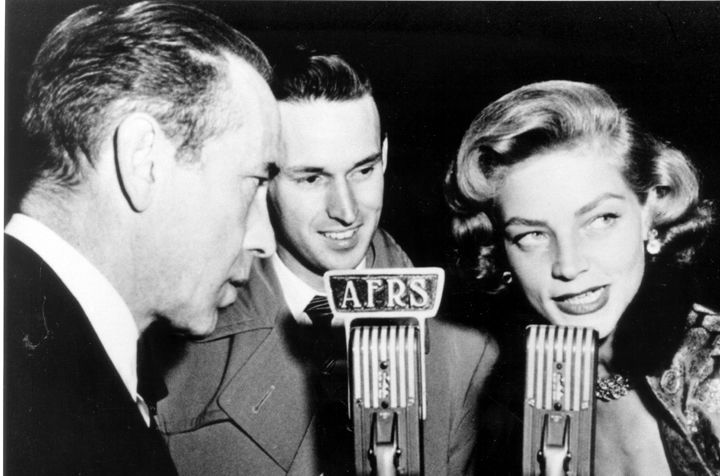
Humphrey Bogart, Jack Brown, and Lauren Bacall with RCA Varacoustic MI-6203 ribbon microphones broadcast to troops overseas during World War II.

In 1916, E.C. Wente of Western Electric developed the next breakthrough with the first condenser microphone. In 1923, the first practical moving coil microphone was built. The Marconi-Sykes magnetophone, developed by Captain H. J. Round, became the standard for BBC studios in London. This was improved in 1930 by Alan Blumlein and Herbert Holman who released the HB1A and was the best standard of the day.

Also in 1923, the ribbon microphone was introduced, another electromagnetic type, believed to have been the work of Harry F. Olson, who applied the concept used in a ribbon speaker to making a microphone. Over the years these microphones were developed by several companies, most notably RCA that made large advances in pattern control, to give the microphone directionality.

The introduction of the Neumann U 47 in 1949 was a turning point for microphone technology. It was the first studio condenser microphone to use a large dual-diaphragm capsule with switchable pickup patterns and a vacuum tube amplifier, setting a new standard for high-fidelity, warm, and detailed vocal and instrument recording. With television and film technology booming there was a demand for high-fidelity microphones and greater directionality. Electro-Voice responded with their Academy Award-winning shotgun microphone in 1963.

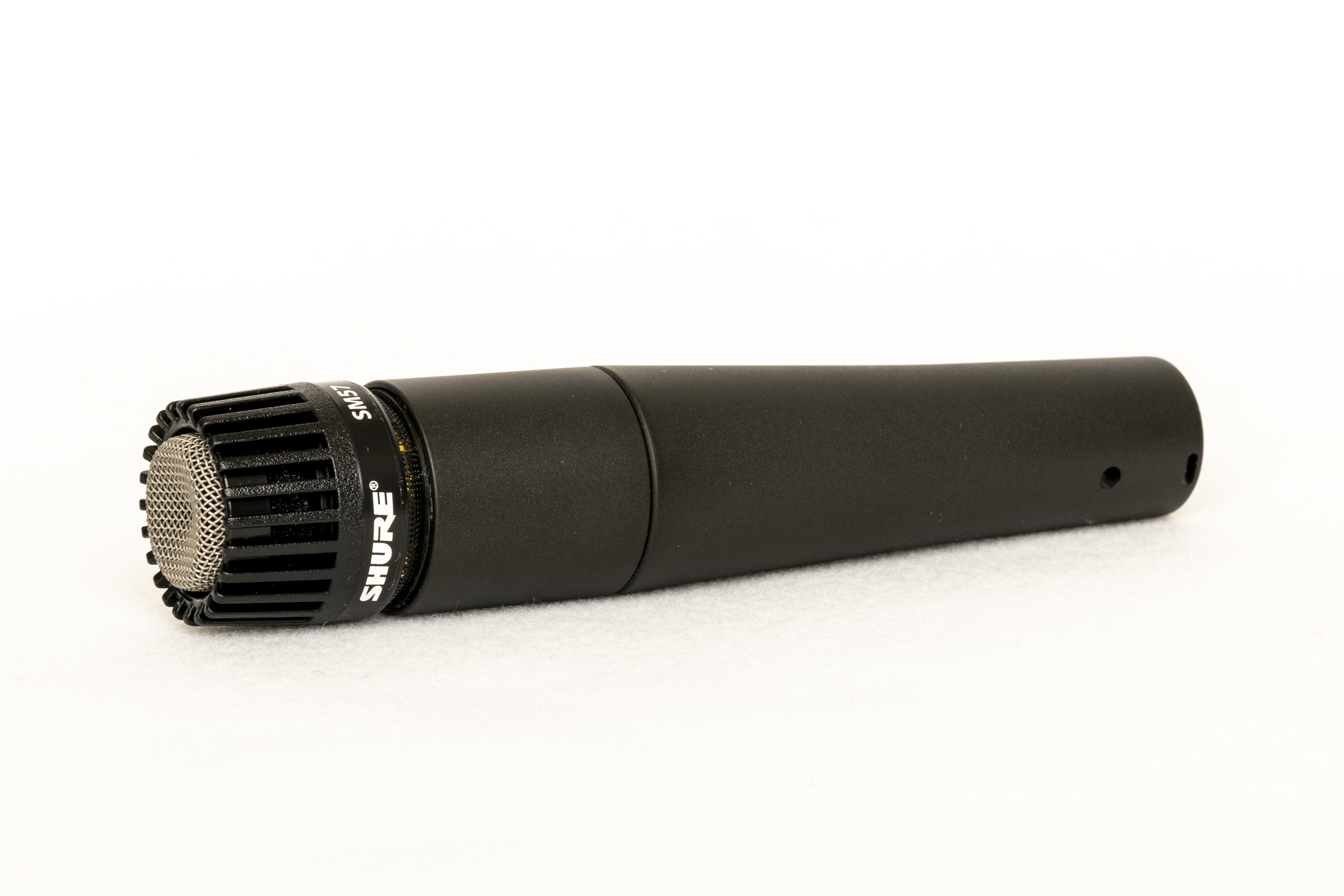
A modern version of the Shure SM57 dynamic microphone

The Shure SM57 of 1965 revolutionized the recording of instruments and amplified live music. The SM57 used the Unidyne III capsule to deliver clear and distortion-free sound. Its compact and rugged design allowed it to be put close to drums and amplifiers. It has become one of the top selling microphones in history.

== Varieties ==
Microphones are categorized by their transducer principle (condenser, dynamic, etc.) and by their directional characteristics (omni, cardioid, etc.). Sometimes other characteristics such as diaphragm size, intended use or orientation of the principal sound input to the principal axis (end- or side-address) of the microphone are used to describe the microphone.

=== Condenser ===
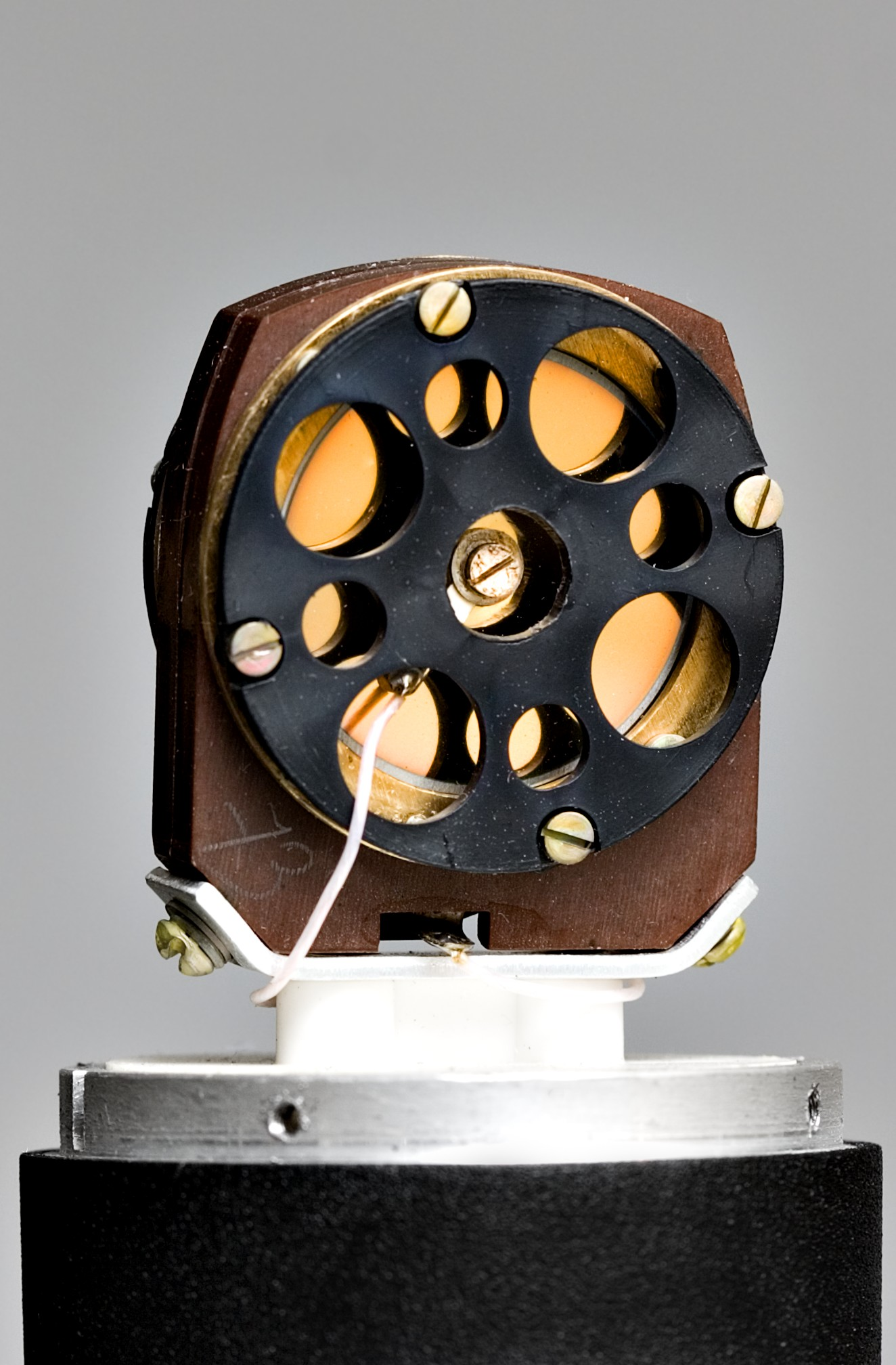
Inside the Oktava 319 condenser microphone

Inner workings of the condenser microphone

The condenser microphone, invented at Western Electric in 1916 by E. C. Wente, is also called a capacitor microphone or electrostatic microphone—capacitors were historically called condensers. The diaphragm acts as one plate of a capacitor, and audio vibrations produce changes in the distance between the plates. Because the capacitance of the plates is inversely proportional to the distance between them, the vibrations produce changes in capacitance. These changes in capacitance are used to measure the audio signal. The assembly of fixed and movable plates is called an element or capsule.

Condenser microphones span the range from telephone mouthpieces through inexpensive karaoke microphones to high-fidelity recording microphones. They generally produce a high-quality audio signal and are now the popular choice in laboratory and recording studio applications. The inherent suitability of this technology is due to the very small mass that must be moved by the incident sound wave compared to other microphone types that require the sound wave to do more work.

Condenser microphones require a power source, provided either via microphone inputs on equipment as phantom power or from a small battery. Power is necessary for establishing the capacitor plate voltage and is also needed to power the microphone electronics. Condenser microphones are also available with two diaphragms that can be electrically connected to provide a range of polar patterns, such as cardioid, omnidirectional, and figure-eight. It is also possible to vary the pattern continuously with some microphones, for example, the Røde NT2000 or CAD M179.

There are two main categories of condenser microphones, depending on the method of extracting the audio signal from the transducer: DC-biased microphones and radio frequency (RF) or high frequency (HF) condenser microphones.

==== DC-biased condenser ====
With a DC-biased condenser microphone, the plates are biased with a fixed charge (Q). The voltage maintained across the capacitor plates changes with the vibrations in the air, according to the capacitance equation (C = Q/V), where Q = charge in coulombs, C = capacitance in farads and V = potential difference in volts. A nearly constant charge is maintained on the capacitor. As the capacitance changes, the charge across the capacitor does change very slightly, but at audible frequencies it is sensibly constant. The capacitance of the capsule (around 5 to 100 pF) and the value of the bias resistor (100 MΩ to tens of GΩ) form a filter that is high-pass for the audio signal, and low-pass for the bias voltage. Note that the time constant of an RC circuit equals the product of the resistance and capacitance.

Within the time frame of the capacitance change (as much as 50 ms at 20 Hz audio signal), the charge is practically constant and the voltage across the capacitor changes instantaneously to reflect the change in capacitance. The voltage across the capacitor varies above and below the bias voltage. The voltage difference between the bias and the capacitor is seen across the series resistor. The voltage across the resistor is amplified for performance or recording. In most cases, the electronics in the microphone itself contribute no voltage gain as the voltage differential is quite significant, up to several volts for high sound levels.

==== RF condenser ====
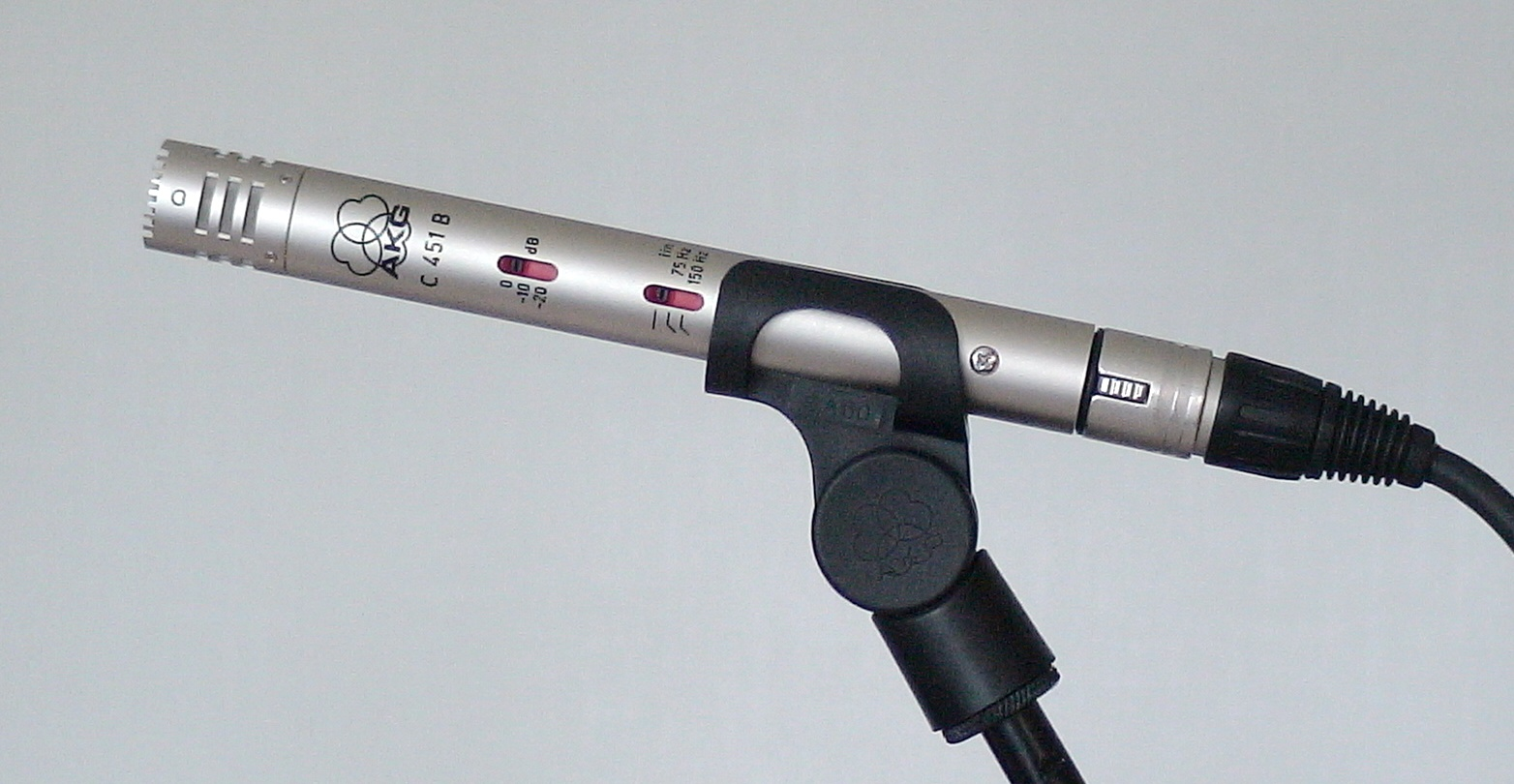
AKG C451B small-diaphragm condenser microphone

RF condenser microphones use a comparatively low RF voltage, generated by a low-noise oscillator. The signal from the oscillator may either be amplitude modulated by the capacitance changes produced by the sound waves moving the capsule diaphragm, or the capsule may be part of a resonant circuit that modulates the frequency of the oscillator signal. Demodulation yields a low-noise audio frequency signal with a very low source impedance. The absence of a high bias voltage permits the use of a diaphragm with looser tension, which may be used to achieve wider frequency response due to higher compliance. The RF biasing process results in a lower electrical impedance capsule, a useful by-product of which is that RF condenser microphones can be operated in damp weather conditions that could create problems in DC-biased microphones with contaminated insulating surfaces. The Sennheiser MKH series of microphones use the RF biasing technique. A covert, remotely energized application of the same physical principle called the Thing was devised by Soviet Russian inventor Leon Theremin and used to bug the US Ambassador's residence in Moscow between 1945 and 1952.

==== Electret condenser ====
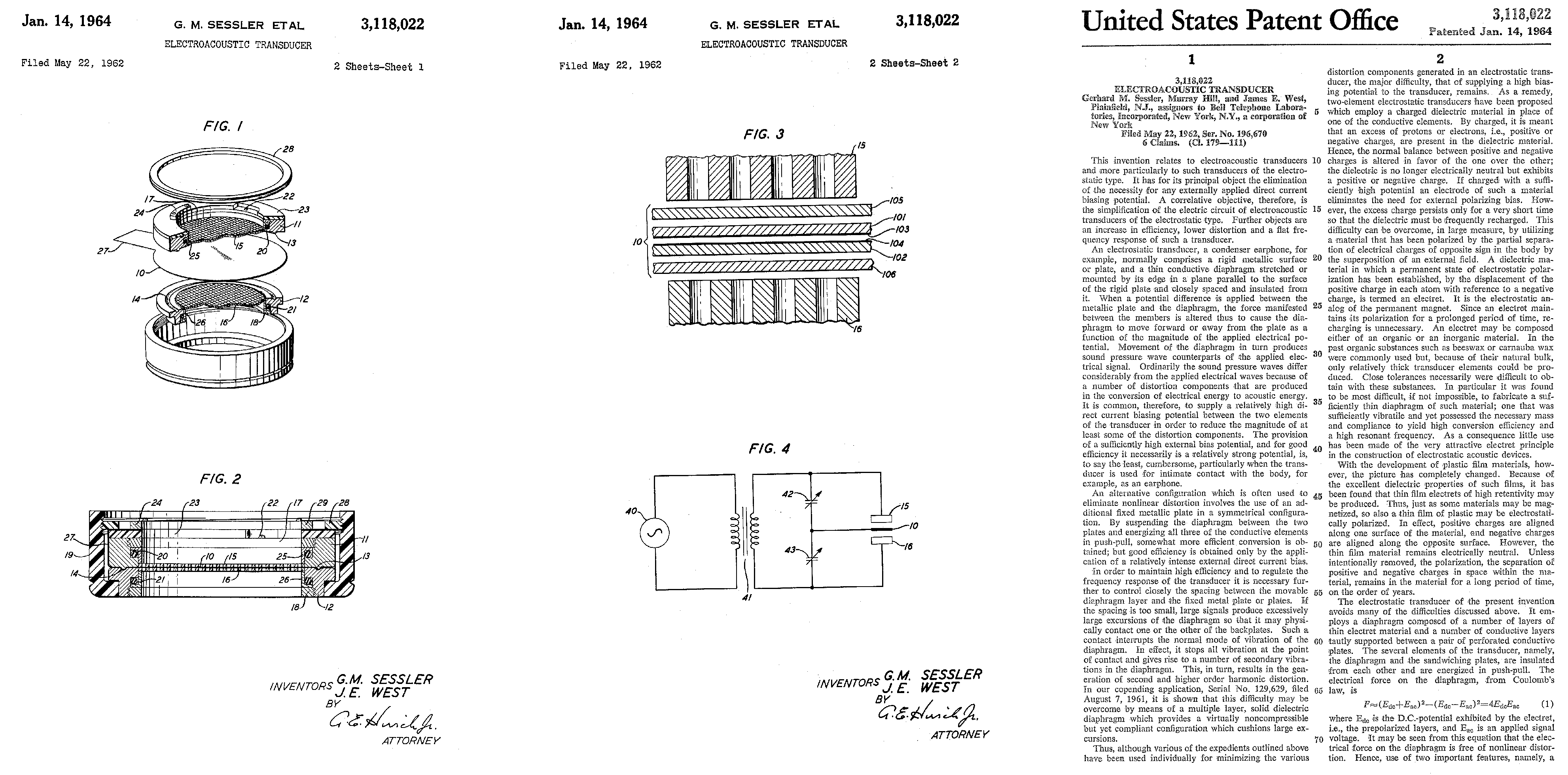
First patent on foil electret microphone by G. M. Sessler et al. (pages 1 to 3)

An electret microphone is a type of condenser microphone invented by Gerhard Sessler and James West at Bell Laboratories in 1962. The externally applied charge used for a conventional condenser microphone is replaced by a permanent charge in an electret material. An electret is a ferroelectric material that has been permanently electrically charged or polarized. The name comes from electrostatic and magnet; a static charge is embedded in an electret by the alignment of the static charges in the material, much the way a permanent magnet is made by aligning the magnetic domains in a piece of iron.

Due to their good performance and ease of manufacture, hence low cost, the vast majority of microphones made today are electret microphones; a semiconductor manufacturer estimates annual production at over one billion units. They are used in many applications, from high-quality recording and lavalier (lapel mic) use to built-in microphones in small sound recording devices and telephones. Prior to the proliferation of MEMS microphones, nearly all cell-phone, computer, PDA and headset microphones were electret types.

Unlike other capacitor microphones, they require no polarizing voltage, but often contain an integrated preamplifier that does require power. This preamplifier is frequently phantom powered in sound reinforcement and studio applications. Monophonic microphones designed for personal computers (PCs), sometimes called multimedia microphones, use a 3.5 mm plug as usually used for stereo connections; the ring, instead of carrying the signal for a second channel, carries power.

==== Valve microphone ====
A valve microphone is a condenser microphone that uses a vacuum tube (valve) amplifier. They remain popular with enthusiasts of tube sound.

=== Dynamic ===
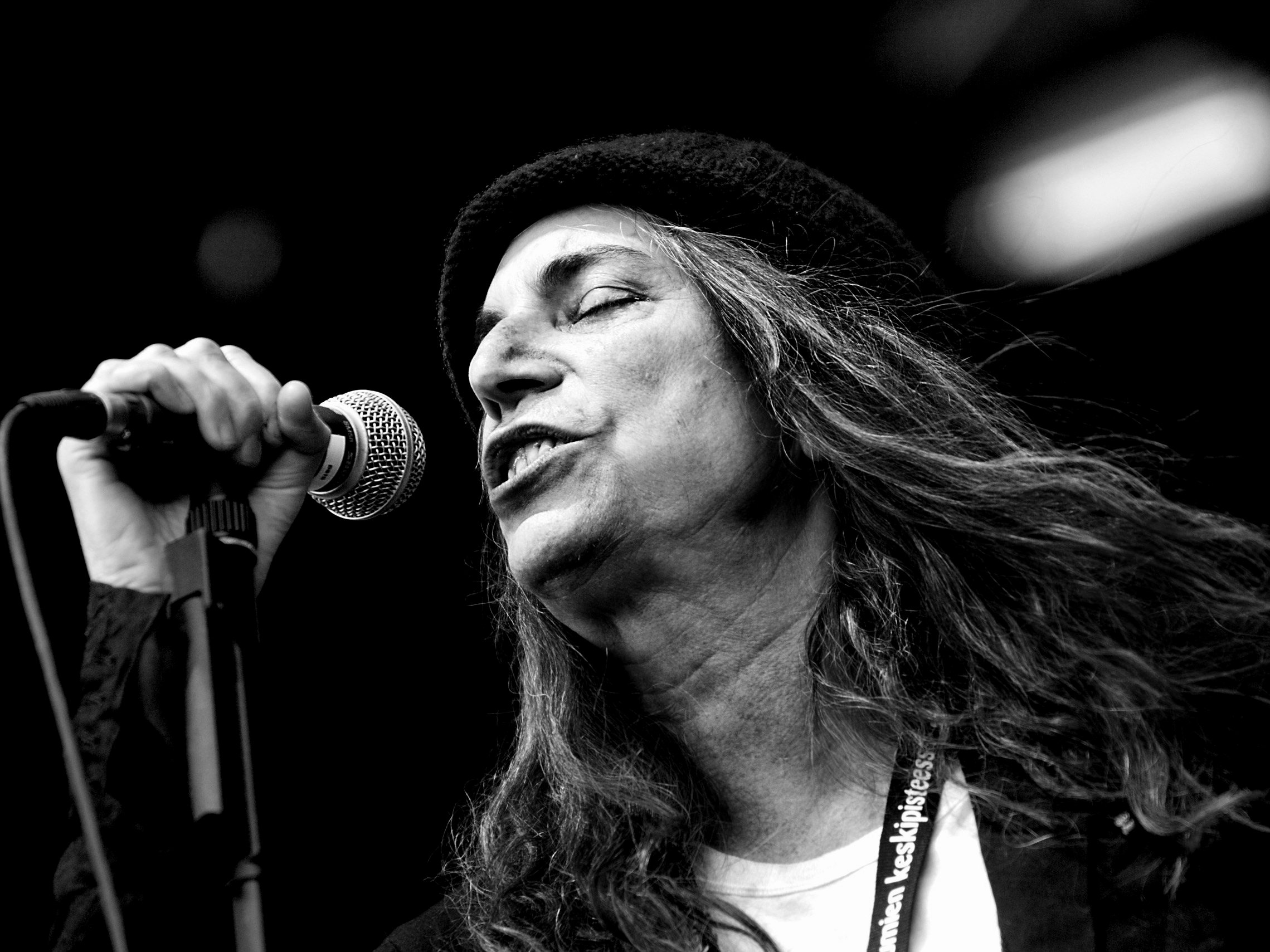
Patti Smith singing into a Shure SM58 (dynamic cardioid type) microphone

Inner workings of a dynamic microphone

The dynamic microphone (also known as the moving-coil microphone) works via electromagnetic induction. They are robust, relatively inexpensive and resistant to moisture. This, coupled with their potentially high gain before feedback, makes them popular for on-stage use.

Dynamic microphones use the same dynamic principle as in a loudspeaker, only reversed. A small movable induction coil, positioned in the magnetic field of a permanent magnet, is attached to the diaphragm. When sound enters through the windscreen of the microphone, the sound wave moves the diaphragm, which moves the coil in the magnetic field, producing a varying voltage across the coil through electromagnetic induction.

=== Ribbon ===
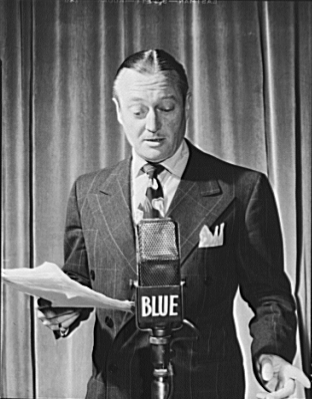
Edmund Lowe using a ribbon microphone

Ribbon microphones use a thin, usually corrugated metal ribbon suspended in a magnetic field. The ribbon is electrically connected to the microphone's output, and its vibration within the magnetic field generates the electrical signal. Ribbon microphones are similar to moving coil microphones in the sense that both produce sound by means of magnetic induction. Basic ribbon microphones detect sound in a bi-directional (also called figure-eight, as in the diagram below) pattern because the ribbon is open on both sides. Also, because the ribbon has much less mass, it responds to the air velocity rather than the sound pressure. Though the symmetrical front and rear pickup can be a nuisance in normal stereo recording, the high side rejection can be used to advantage by positioning a ribbon microphone horizontally, for example above cymbals, so that the rear lobe picks up sound only from the cymbals. The figure-eight response of a ribbon microphone is ideal for Blumlein pair stereo recording. Other directional patterns are produced by enclosing one side of the ribbon in an acoustic trap or baffle, allowing sound to reach only one side. The classic RCA Type 77-DX microphone has several externally adjustable positions of the internal baffle, allowing the selection of several response patterns ranging from figure-eight to unidirectional.

A good low-frequency response in older ribbon microphones could be obtained only when the ribbon was suspended very loosely, which made them relatively fragile. Modern ribbon materials, including new nanomaterials, have now been introduced that eliminate those concerns and even improve the effective dynamic range of ribbon microphones at low frequencies. Protective wind screens can reduce the danger of damaging a vintage ribbon, and also reduce plosive artifacts in the recording.

In common with other classes of dynamic microphones, ribbon microphones do not require phantom power; in fact, this voltage can damage some older ribbon microphones. Some new modern ribbon microphone designs incorporate a preamplifier and, therefore, do require phantom power, and circuits of modern passive ribbon microphones (i.e. those without the aforementioned preamplifier) are specifically designed to resist damage to the ribbon and transformer by phantom power.

=== Carbon ===
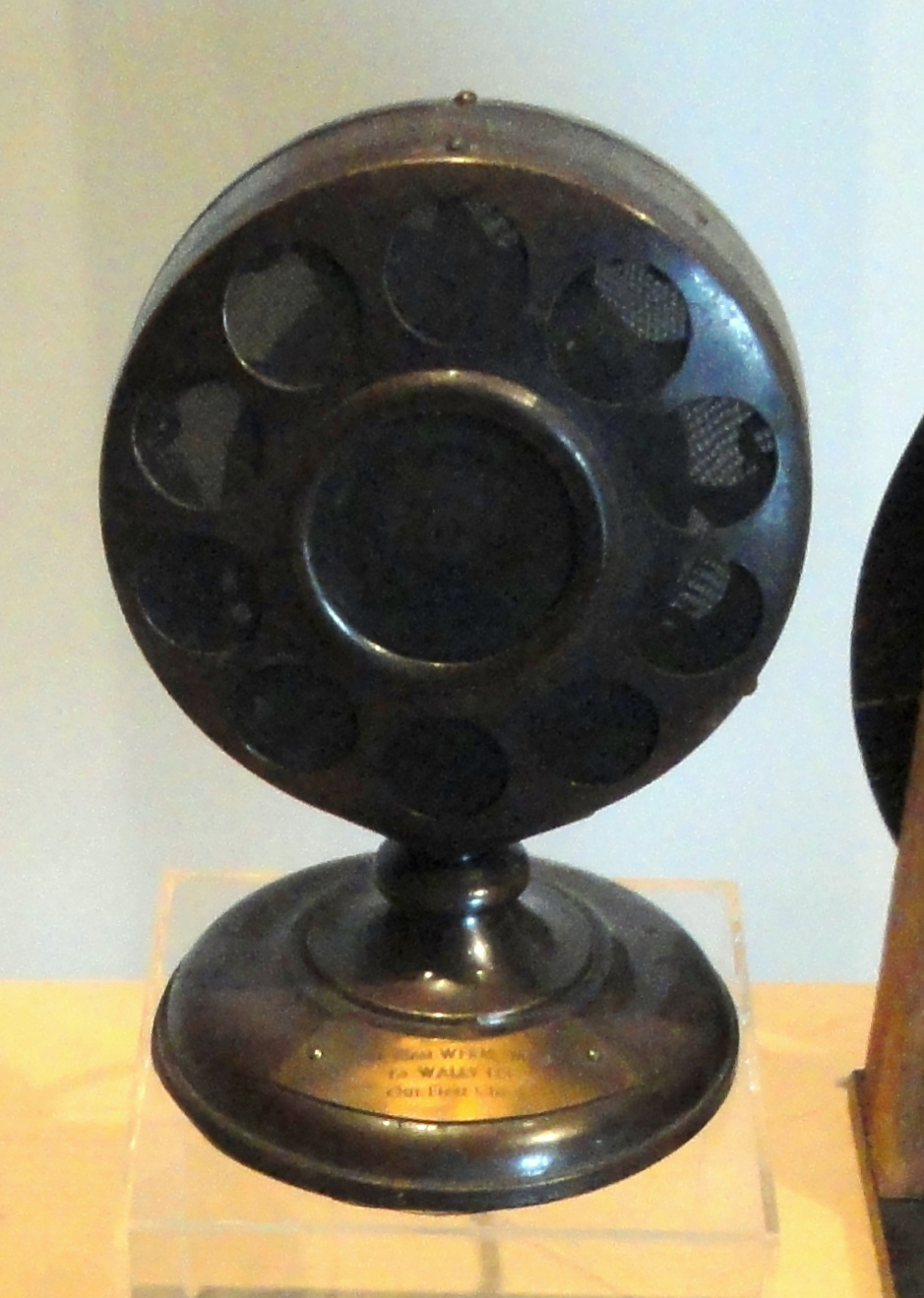
Western Electric double button carbon microphone

The carbon microphone was the earliest type of microphone. The carbon button microphone (also known as the Berliner or Edison microphone) uses a capsule or button containing carbon granules pressed between two metal plates. A voltage is applied across the metal plates, causing a small current to flow through the carbon. One of the plates, the diaphragm, vibrates in sympathy with incident sound waves, applying a varying pressure to the carbon. The changing pressure deforms the granules, causing the contact area between each pair of adjacent granules to change, and this causes the electrical resistance of the mass of granules to change. The changes in resistance cause a corresponding change in the current flowing through the microphone, producing the electrical signal. Carbon microphones were once commonly used in telephones; they have extremely low-quality sound reproduction and a very limited frequency response range but are very robust devices. The Boudet microphone, which used relatively large carbon balls, was similar to the granule carbon button microphones.

Unlike other microphone types, the carbon microphone can also be used as a type of amplifier, using a small amount of sound energy to control a larger amount of electrical energy. Carbon microphones were used as early telephone repeaters, making long-distance phone calls possible in the era before vacuum tubes. Called a Brown's relay, these repeaters worked by mechanically coupling a magnetic telephone receiver to a carbon microphone: the faint signal from the receiver was transferred to the microphone, where it modulated a stronger electric current, producing a stronger electrical signal to send down the line.

=== Piezoelectric ===
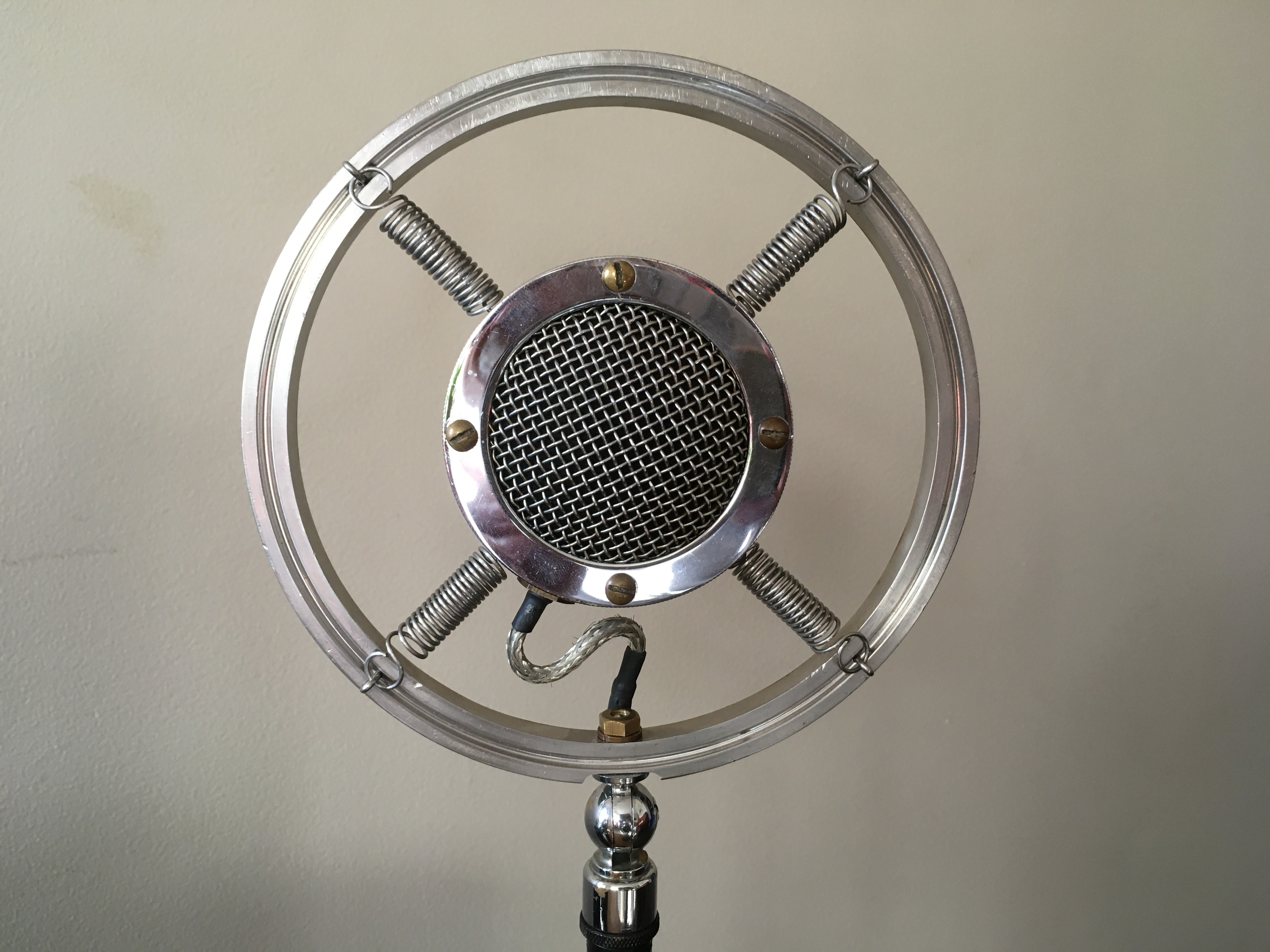
Vintage Astatic crystal microphone

A crystal microphone or piezo microphone uses the phenomenon of piezoelectricity—the ability of some materials to produce a voltage when subjected to pressure (Note: An example of this is potassium sodium tartrate, which is a piezoelectric crystal that works as a transducer, both as a microphone and as a slimline loudspeaker component.)—to convert vibrations into an electrical signal. Crystal microphones were once commonly supplied with vacuum tube (valve) equipment, such as domestic tape recorders. Their high output impedance matched the high input impedance (typically about 10 MΩ) of the vacuum tube input stage well. They were difficult to match to early transistor equipment and were supplanted by dynamic microphones, and later small electret condenser devices. The high impedance of the crystal microphone made it very susceptible to handling noise, both from the microphone itself and from the connecting cable.

Piezoelectric transducers are often used as contact microphones to amplify sound from acoustic musical instruments, to sense drum hits and trigger electronic samples, and to record sound in challenging environments, such as underwater under high pressure. Saddle-mounted pickups on acoustic guitars are typically piezoelectric devices that contact the strings passing over the saddle. This type of microphone is different from magnetic coil pickups commonly visible on typical electric guitars, which use magnetic induction, rather than mechanical coupling, to pick up vibration.

=== Fiber-optic ===
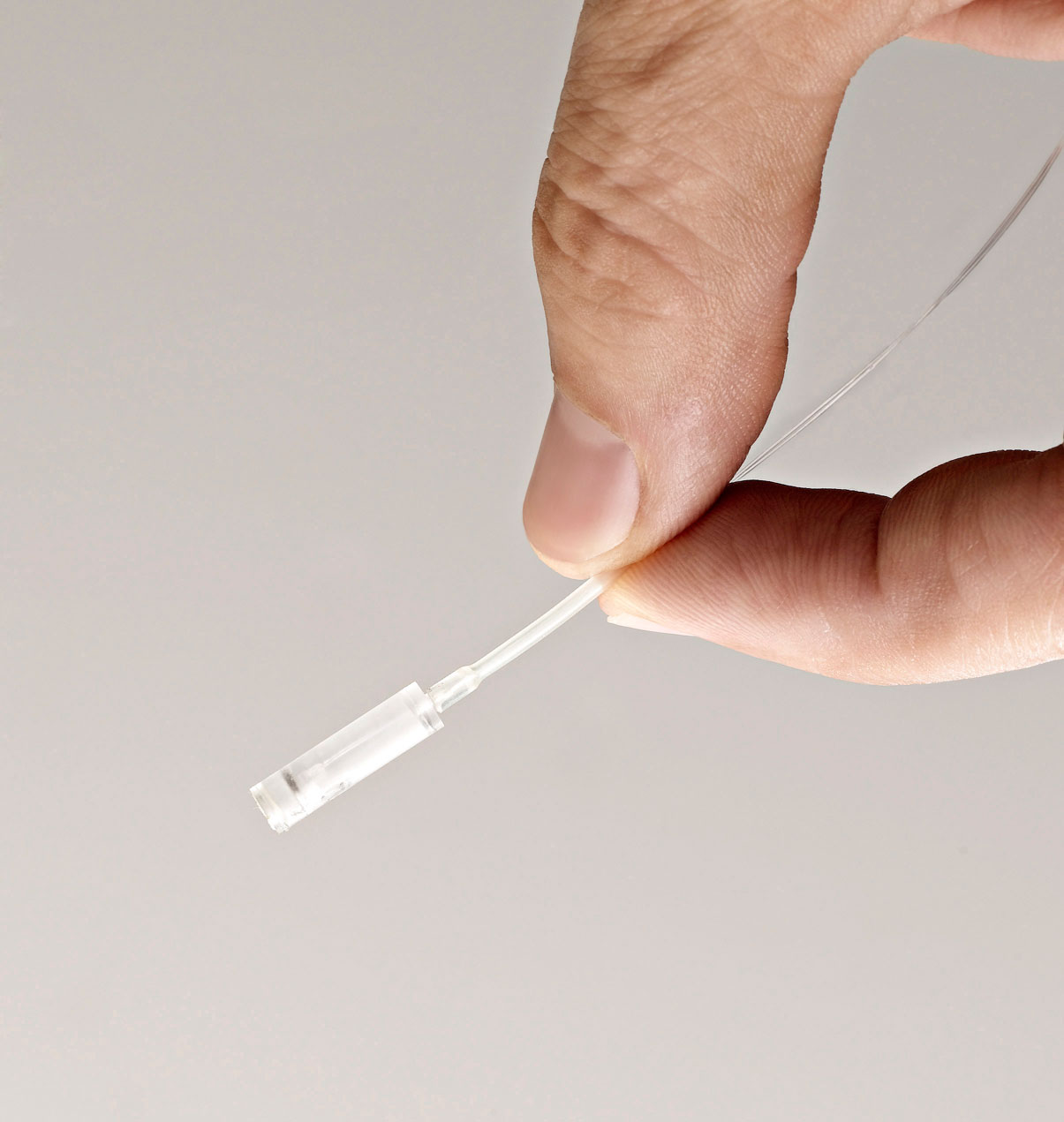
The Optoacoustics 1140 fiber-optic microphone

A fiber-optic microphone converts acoustic waves into electrical signals by sensing changes in light intensity, instead of sensing changes in capacitance or magnetic fields as with conventional microphones.

During operation, light from a laser source travels through an optical fiber to illuminate the surface of a reflective diaphragm. Sound vibrations of the diaphragm modulate the intensity of light reflecting off the diaphragm in a specific direction. The modulated light is then transmitted over a second optical fiber to a photodetector, which transforms the intensity-modulated light into analog or digital audio for transmission or recording. Fiber-optic microphones possess high dynamic and frequency range, similar to the best high-fidelity conventional microphones.

Fiber-optic microphones do not react to or influence any electrical, magnetic, electrostatic or radioactive fields (this is called EMI/RFI immunity). The fiber-optic microphone design is therefore ideal for use in areas where conventional microphones are ineffective or dangerous, such as inside industrial turbines or in magnetic resonance imaging (MRI) equipment environments.

Fiber-optic microphones are robust, resistant to environmental changes in heat and moisture, and can be produced for any directionality or impedance matching. The distance between the microphone's light source and its photodetector may be up to several kilometers without the need for any preamplifier or other electrical device, making fiber-optic microphones suitable for industrial and surveillance acoustic monitoring.

Fiber-optic microphones are used in very specific application areas such as for infrasound monitoring and noise cancellation. They have proven especially useful in medical applications, such as allowing radiologists, staff and patients within the powerful and noisy magnetic field to converse normally, inside the MRI suites as well as in remote control rooms. Other uses include industrial equipment monitoring and audio calibration and measurement, high-fidelity recording and law enforcement.

=== Fabry-Pérot interferometer-based microphones ===
A subtype of fiber-optic microphone uses a Fabry-Pérot interferometer as the sensing element. In these sensors, two partially reflective mirrors form an optical cavity through which light propagates.

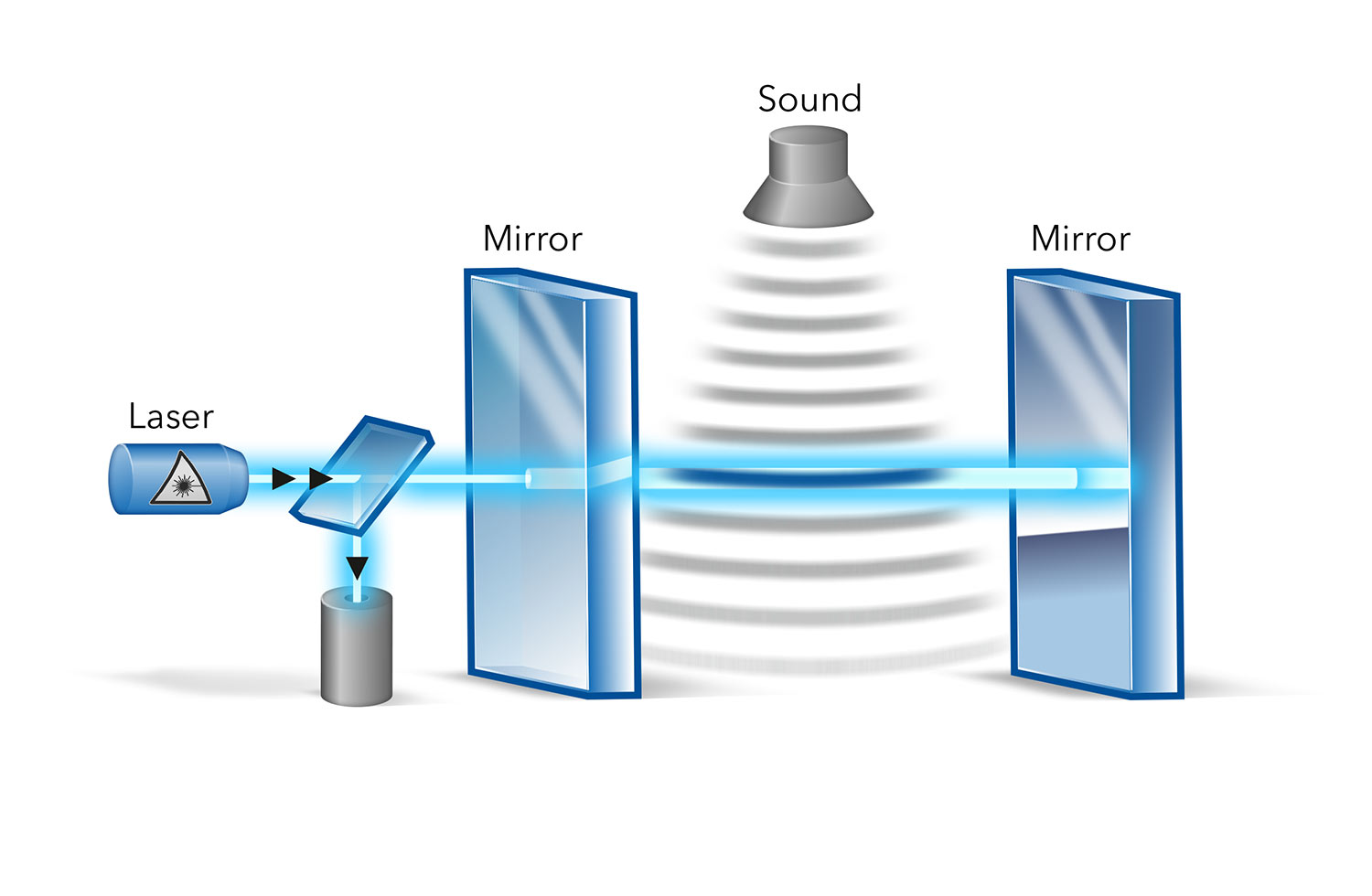
Principle of the Optical Microphone

Acoustic waves passing through the cavity change the refractive index of the medium inside the interferometer. This modifies the optical path length and results in a measurable modulation of the transmitted or reflected light intensity, which can be converted into an electrical signal.

Because the sensing principle does not rely on a mechanically deflecting membrane, the acoustic pressure directly modulates the refractive index of the medium within the optical cavity. This membrane-free detection mechanism enables operation over a wide frequency range extending from the audible spectrum into the ultrasonic regime. Optical microphones of this type can detect refractive index changes below approximately 10⁻¹⁴, corresponding to pressure variations on the order of micro-pascals, and can tolerate sound pressure levels above 180 dB SPL. Reported implementations achieve frequency ranges from the audible spectrum up to several megahertz, for example up to approximately 4 MHz in air and higher frequencies in liquids. Such sensors can therefore detect acoustic signals in both gases and liquids. Because the sensing mechanism does not rely on a moving inert mass, Fabry-Pérot optical microphones can exhibit a fast temporal response and are used in ultrasonic metrology and as reference sensors for the calibration of acoustic and ultrasonic emitters.

Due to their fiber-optic design and the absence of electronic components at the sensing point, these microphones are largely immune to electromagnetic interference. Applications include acoustic research, industrial monitoring, and non-destructive testing (NDT) of materials. The sensing principle enables contactless detection of ultrasonic waves without direct contact with the test surface, which is used in non-destructive testing applications, including in the automotive and aerospace industries.

=== Laser ===
A laser beam is aimed at the surface of a window or other plane surface that is affected by sound. The vibrations of this surface change the angle at which the beam is reflected, and the motion of the laser spot from the returning beam is detected and converted to an audio signal. In a more robust and expensive implementation, the returned light is split and fed to an interferometer, which detects movement of the surface by changes in the optical path length of the reflected beam. The former implementation is a tabletop experiment; the latter requires an extremely stable laser and precise optics. Laser microphones have been studied for their ability to detect sound vibrations on distant surfaces.

An experimental type of laser microphone is a device that uses a laser beam and smoke or vapor to detect sound vibrations in free air. On August 25, 2009, US patent 7,580,533 issued for a Particulate Flow Detection Microphone based on a laser-photocell pair with a moving stream of smoke or vapor in the laser beam's path. Sound pressure waves cause disturbances in the smoke that in turn cause variations in the amount of laser light reaching the photodetector. A prototype of the device was demonstrated at the 127th Audio Engineering Society convention in New York City from 9 through October 12, 2009.

=== Liquid ===
Early microphones did not reproduce intelligible speech until Alexander Graham Bell made improvements, including a variable-resistance water microphone and transmitter. Bell's water transmitter consisted of a metal cup filled with water with a small amount of sulfuric acid added. A sound wave caused the diaphragm to move, forcing a needle to move up and down in the water. The electrical resistance between the wire and the cup was then inversely proportional to the size of the water meniscus around the submerged needle. Elisha Gray filed a patent caveat for a version using a brass rod instead of the needle. Other minor variations and improvements were made to the water microphone by Majoranna, Chambers, Vanni, Sykes, and Elisha Gray, and one version was patented by Reginald Fessenden in 1903. These were the first working microphones, but they were impractical for commercial applications. The famous first phone conversation between Bell and Watson took place using a water microphone.

=== MEMS ===
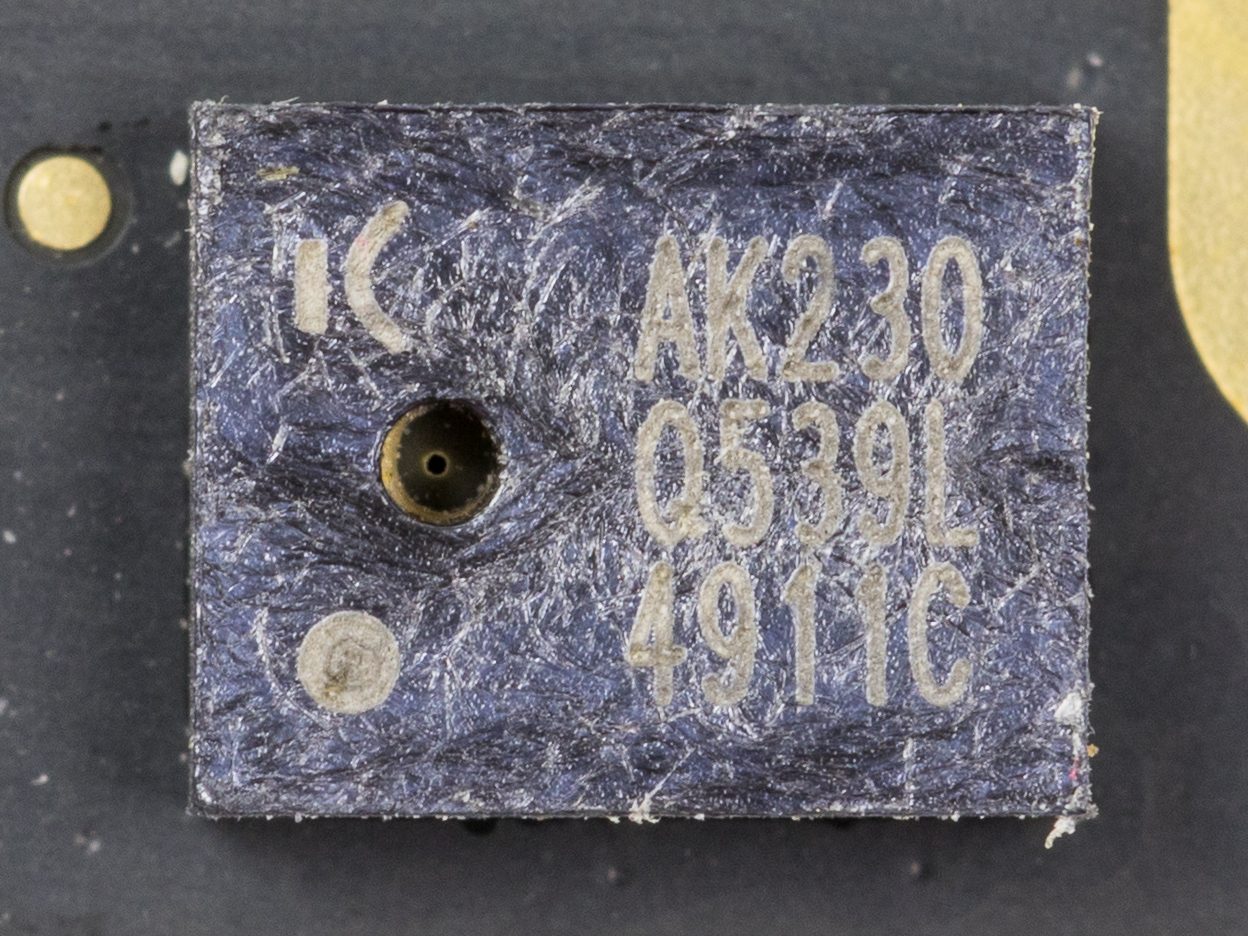
MEMS microphone Akustica AKU230

The MEMS microphone is also called a microphone chip or silicon microphone. A pressure-sensitive diaphragm is etched directly into a silicon wafer by MEMS processing techniques and is usually accompanied with an integrated preamplifier. Most MEMS microphones are variants of the condenser microphone design. Digital MEMS microphones have built-in analog-to-digital converter (ADC) circuits on the same CMOS chip, making the chip a digital microphone and so more readily integrated with modern digital products. Major manufacturers producing MEMS silicon microphones are Cirrus Logic, InvenSense (product line sold by Analog Devices), Akustica, Infineon, Knowles Electronics, Memstech, Sonion MEMS, Vesper, AAC Acoustic Technologies, and Omron. MEMS microphones are commonly used in smartphones, tablets, computers and other consumer electronics applications such as game controllers and headsets.

In the 2010s, piezoelectric MEMS microphones were developed. These are a significant architectural and material change from existing condenser-style MEMS designs.

=== Plasma ===
In a plasma microphone, an experimental form of microphone, a plasma arc of ionized gas is used. The sound waves cause variations in the pressure around the plasma, in turn causing variations in temperature, which alter the conductance of the plasma. These variations in conductance can be picked up as variations superimposed on the electrical supply to the plasma.

=== Speakers as dynamic microphones ===
A loudspeaker, a transducer that turns an electrical signal into sound waves, is the functional opposite of a microphone. Since a conventional speaker is similar in construction to a dynamic microphone (with a diaphragm, coil and magnet), speakers can actually work in reverse as microphones. Reciprocity applies, so the resulting microphone has the same impairments as a single-driver loudspeaker: limited low- and high-end frequency response, poorly controlled directivity, and low sensitivity. In practical use, speakers are sometimes used as microphones in applications where high bandwidth and sensitivity are not needed, such as intercoms, walkie-talkies or video game voice chat peripherals.

However, there is at least one practical application that exploits those weaknesses: the use of a medium-sized woofer placed closely in front of a bass drum in a drum set to act as a microphone. A commercial product example is the Yamaha Subkick, a 6.5-inch (170 mm) woofer shock-mounted into a 10-inch drum shell used in front of kick drums. Since a relatively massive membrane is unable to transduce high frequencies while being capable of tolerating strong low-frequency transients, the speaker is often ideal for picking up the kick drum while reducing bleed from the nearby cymbals and snare drum.

== Capsule design and directivity ==
The inner elements of a microphone are the primary source of differences in directivity. A pressure microphone uses a diaphragm between a fixed internal volume of air and the environment and responds uniformly to pressure from all directions, so it is said to be omnidirectional. A pressure-gradient microphone uses a diaphragm that is at least partially open on both sides. The pressure difference between the two sides produces its directional characteristics. A pure pressure-gradient microphone is equally sensitive to sounds arriving from front or back but insensitive to sounds arriving from the side because sound arriving at the front and back at the same time creates no gradient between the two. The characteristic polar pattern of a pure pressure-gradient microphone is a figure-8. Other polar patterns are derived by creating a capsule that combines these two effects in different ways. The cardioid, for instance, features a partially closed backside, so its response is a combination of pressure and pressure-gradient characteristics. Other factors, such as the external shape of the microphone and external devices such as interference tubes, can further alter a microphone's directional response.

== Polar patterns ==
A microphone's directionality or polar pattern indicates how sensitive it is to sounds arriving at different angles about its central axis. The polar patterns illustrated in this section represent the locus of points in polar coordinates that produce the same signal level output in the microphone if a given sound pressure level (SPL) is generated from that point.

How the physical body of the microphone is oriented relative to the diagrams depends on the microphone design. For large-membrane microphones such as in the Oktava (pictured above), the upward direction in the polar diagram is usually perpendicular to the microphone body, commonly known as side fire or side address. For small diaphragm microphones such as the Shure (also pictured above), it usually extends from the axis of the microphone, commonly known as end fire or top or end address.

Polar pattern is influenced by shielding (meaning diffraction, dissipation or absorption) by the housing itself and electronically combining dual membranes. Some microphone designs combine principles in creating the desired polar pattern.

=== Omnidirectional ===
Omnidirectional polar pattern

An omnidirectional (or nondirectional) microphone's response is ideally a sphere in three dimensions. In the real world, as with directional microphones, the polar pattern for an omnidirectional microphone is a function of frequency. The body of the microphone is not infinitely small and, as a consequence, it tends to get in its own way with respect to sounds arriving from the rear, causing a slight flattening of the polar response. This flattening increases as the diameter of the microphone (assuming it's cylindrical) reaches the wavelength of the frequency in question. Therefore, the smallest diameter microphone gives the best omnidirectional characteristics at high frequencies. The wavelength of sound at 10 kHz is 1.4 inches (36 mm). The smallest measuring microphones are often 0.25 inches (6.4 mm) in diameter, which practically eliminates directionality even up to the highest audible frequencies.

Omnidirectional microphones, unlike cardioids, do not employ resonant cavities as delays, and so can be considered the purest microphones in terms of low coloration. Being pressure sensitive, they can also have a very flat low-frequency response down to 20 Hz or below. Pressure-sensitive microphones also respond much less to wind noise and plosives than directional (velocity-sensitive) microphones.

An example of a nondirectional microphone is the round black eight ball.

=== Cardioid, hypercardioid, supercardioid, subcardioid ===
Cardioid microphone polar sensitivity. The microphone is parallel to the page and facing upwards in each diagram.
Subcardioid

Cardioid

Supercardioid

Hypercardioid

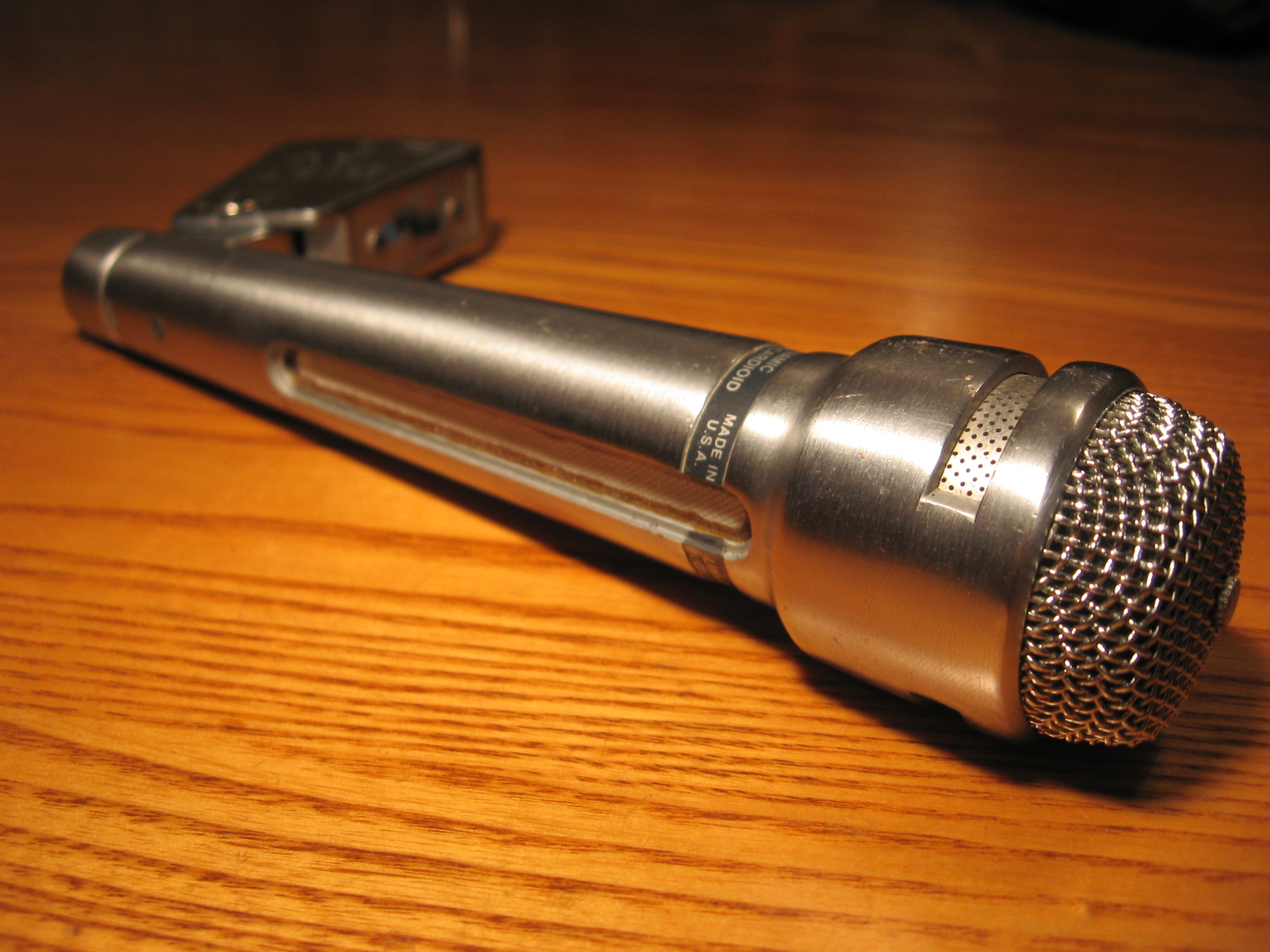
University Sound US664A dynamic supercardioid microphone

The most common unidirectional microphone is a cardioid microphone, so named because the sensitivity pattern is heart-shaped (i.e., a cardioid). In three dimensions, the cardioid is shaped like an apple centered around the microphone, which is the stem of the apple. The cardioid family of microphones are commonly used as vocal or speech microphones since they are good at rejecting sounds from other directions, helping to avoid feedback from the monitors. The Shure SM58, a cardioid microphone, has been the most commonly used microphone for live vocals for more than 50 years.

The cardioid is effectively a superposition of an omnidirectional (pressure) and a figure-8 (pressure gradient) microphone; for sound waves coming from the back, the negative signal from the figure-8 cancels the positive signal from the omnidirectional element, whereas, for sound waves coming from the front, the two add to each other. By combining the two components in different ratios, any pattern between omni and figure-8 can be achieved, which comprises the first-order cardioid family. Common shapes include:

- A hypercardioid microphone is similar to cardioid, but with a slightly larger figure-8 contribution, leading to a tighter area of front sensitivity and a smaller lobe of rear sensitivity. It is produced by combining the two components in a 3:1 ratio, producing nulls at 109.5°. This ratio maximizes the directivity index and directivity factor.
- A supercardioid microphone is similar to a hypercardioid, except there is more front pickup and less rear pickup. It is produced with about a 5:3 ratio, with nulls at 126.9°. This ratio maximizes the front-back ratio; the energy ratio between front and rear radiation.
- The subcardioid microphone has no null points. It is produced with about a 7:3 ratio, with 3–10 dB level difference between the front and back pickup.

Three such cardioid microphones/hydrophones could be orthogonally oriented as a collocated triad to improve the gain and also create a steerable beam pattern.

Since these directional transducer microphones achieve their patterns by sensing pressure gradients, putting them very close to the sound source (at distances of a few centimeters) results in a bass boost due to the increased gradient. This is known as the proximity effect. At low frequencies, a cardioid microphone behaves as an omnidirectional microphone.

=== Bi-directional ===
Bi-directional polar pattern, microphone facing up

Figure-8 or bi-directional microphones receive sound equally from both the front and back of the element. Most ribbon microphones are of this pattern. In principle, they do not respond to sound pressure at all, only to the change in pressure between front and back; since sound arriving from the side reaches front and back equally, there is no difference in pressure and therefore no sensitivity to sound from that direction. In more mathematical terms, while omnidirectional microphones are scalar transducers responding to pressure from any direction, bi-directional microphones are vector transducers responding to the gradient along an axis normal to the plane of the diaphragm. This also has the effect of inverting the output polarity for sounds arriving from the back side.

=== Shotgun ===
The lobar polar pattern associated with shotgun microphones. Microphone facing up.

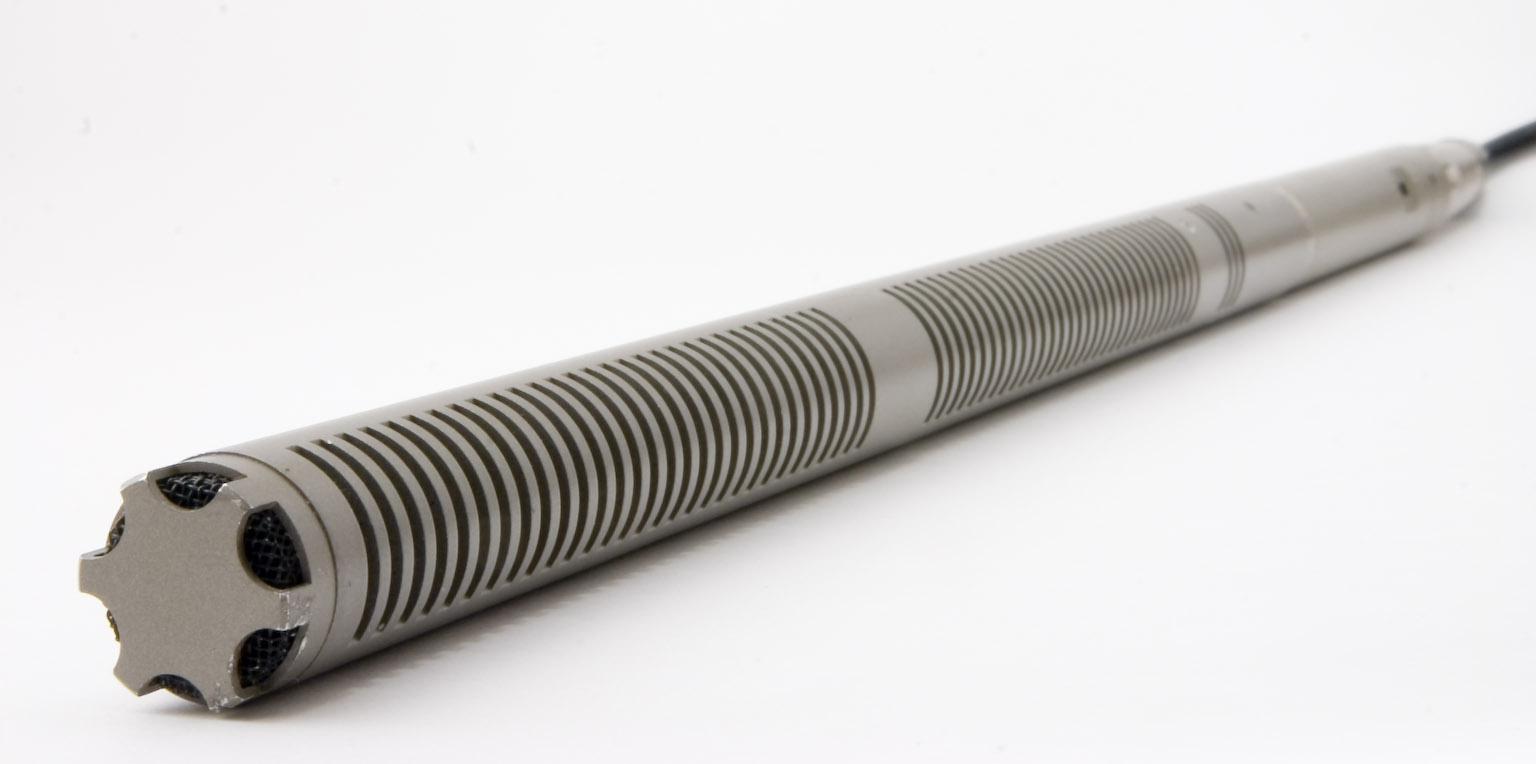
An Audio-Technica shotgun microphone

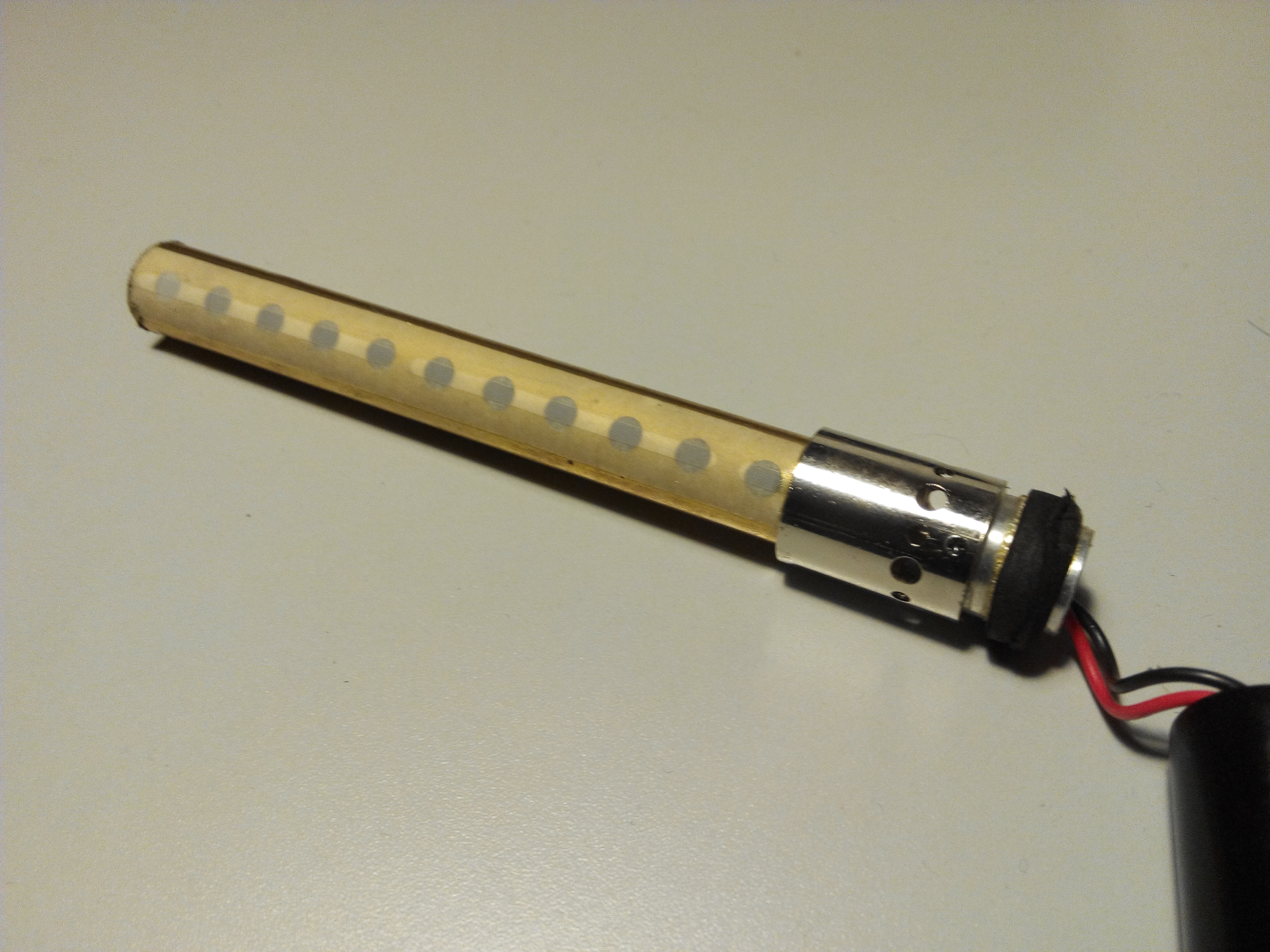
The interference tube of a shotgun microphone. The capsule is at the base of the tube.

Shotgun microphones are extremely good at picking up sound from one specific direction. They capture sound in a narrow pattern similar to hypercardioid or supercardioid directional microphones. They achieve this focused pickup by using a long tube with slots along its length. When sound comes from the sides, the waves entering through different slots cancel each other out, reducing unwanted noise.

This design, however, has some sensitivity to sounds coming from behind the microphone. These rear pickup zones change depending on the frequency of the sound, which can sometimes affect the audio quality by adding unwanted coloration to the recording. This sensitivity is shown in the lobar polar pattern typically associated with these microphones.

== Application-specific designs ==
A lavalier microphone is made for hands-free operation. These small microphones are worn on the body. Originally, they were held in place with a lanyard worn around the neck, but more often they are fastened to clothing with a clip, pin, tape or magnet. The lavalier cord may be hidden by clothes and either run to an RF transmitter in a pocket or clipped to a belt (for mobile use), or run directly to the mixer (for stationary applications).

A wireless microphone transmits the audio as a radio or optical signal rather than via a cable. Most professional wireless microphones send their signal using a small radio transmitter to a nearby receiver connected to the sound system.

A contact microphone picks up vibrations directly from a solid surface or object, as opposed to sound vibrations carried through air. One use for this is to detect sounds of a very low level, such as those from small objects or insects. The microphone commonly consists of a magnetic (moving coil) transducer, contact plate and contact pin. The contact plate is placed directly on the vibrating part of a musical instrument or other surface, and the contact pin transfers vibrations to the coil. Contact microphones have been used to pick up the sound of a snail's heartbeat and the footsteps of ants. A portable version of this microphone has recently been developed.

A throat microphone is a variant of the contact microphone that picks up speech directly from a person's throat, to which it is strapped. This lets the device be used in areas with ambient sounds that would otherwise make the speaker inaudible.

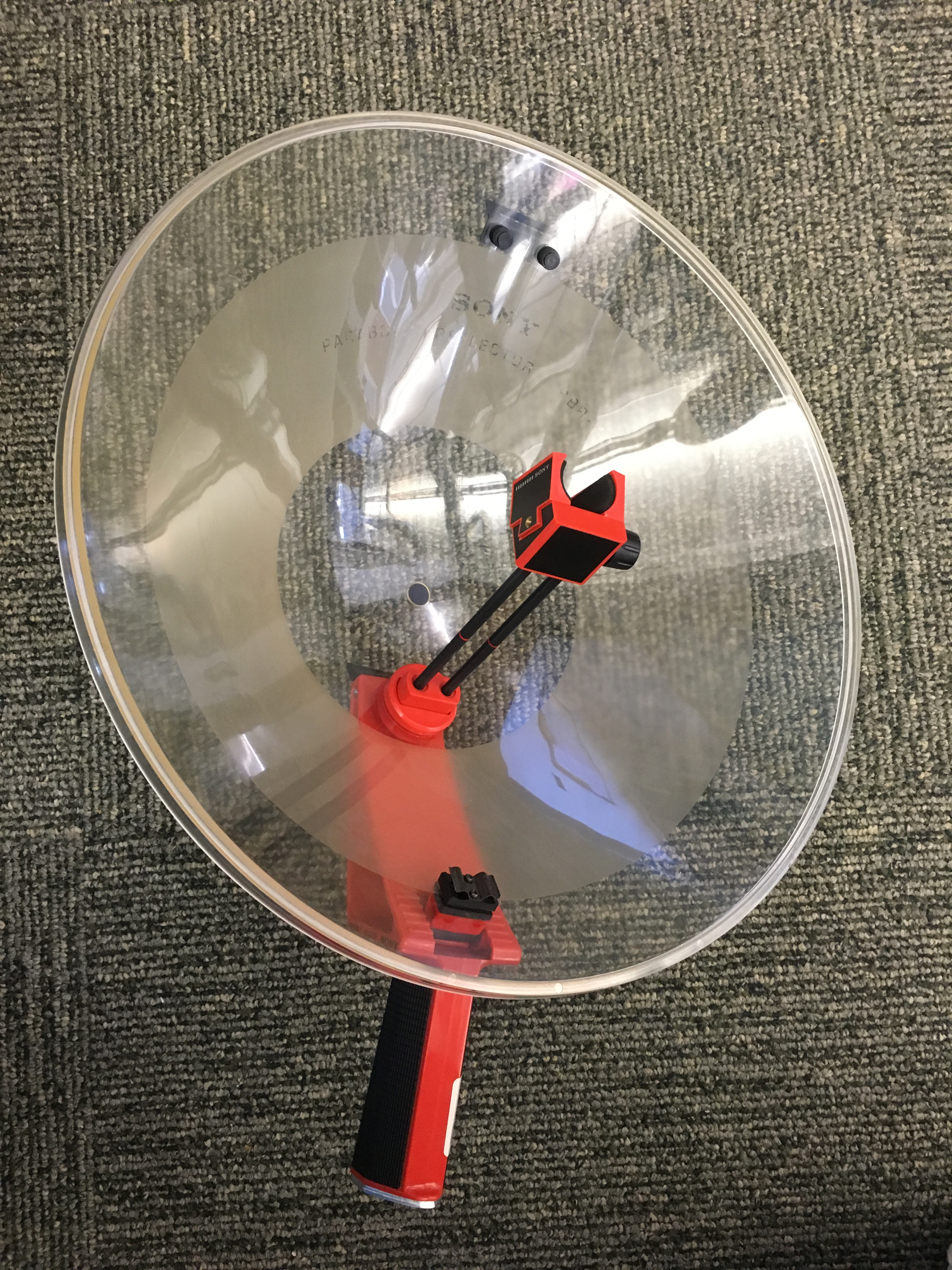
A Sony parabolic reflector, without a microphone. The microphone would face the reflector surface and sound captured by the reflector would bounce towards the microphone.

A parabolic microphone uses a parabolic reflector to collect and focus sound waves onto a microphone receiver, in much the same way that a parabolic antenna (e.g. satellite dish) does with radio waves. Typical uses of this microphone, which has unusually focused front sensitivity and can pick up sounds from many meters away, include nature recording, outdoor sporting events, eavesdropping, law enforcement, and even espionage. Parabolic microphones are not typically used for standard recording applications, because they tend to have a poor low-frequency response as a side effect of their design.

A boundary microphone (or pressure zone microphone) is one or more small omnidirectional or cardioid condenser mic capsule(s) positioned near or flush with a boundary (surface) such as a floor, table, or wall. The capsule(s) is/are typically mounted in a flat plate or housing. The arrangement provides a directional half-space pickup pattern while delivering a relatively phase-coherent output signal.

A stereo microphone integrates two microphones in one unit to produce a stereophonic signal. A stereo microphone is often used for broadcast applications or field recording where it would be impractical to configure two separate condenser microphones in a classic X-Y configuration (see microphone practice) for stereophonic recording. Some such microphones have an adjustable angle of coverage between the two channels.

A noise-canceling microphone is a highly directional design intended for noisy environments. One such use is in aircraft cockpits where they are normally installed as boom microphones on headsets. Another use is in live event support on loud concert stages for vocalists involved with live performances. Many noise-canceling microphones combine signals received from two diaphragms that are in opposite electrical polarity or are processed electronically. In dual diaphragm designs, the main diaphragm is mounted closest to the intended source and the second is positioned farther away from the source so that it can pick up environmental sounds to be subtracted from the main diaphragm's signal. After the two signals have been combined, sounds other than the intended source are greatly reduced, substantially increasing intelligibility. Other noise-canceling designs use one diaphragm that is affected by ports open to the sides and rear of the microphone, with the sum being a 16 dB rejection of sounds that are farther away. One noise-canceling headset design by Crown using a single diaphragm has been used prominently by vocal artists such as Garth Brooks, Britney Spears and Janet Jackson.

== Stereo microphone techniques ==
Various standard techniques are used with microphones used in sound reinforcement at live performances, or for recording in a studio or on a motion picture set. By suitable arrangement of one or more microphones, desirable features of the sound to be collected can be kept, while rejecting unwanted sounds.

== Powering ==
Microphones containing active circuitry, such as most condenser microphones, require power to operate the active components. The first of these used vacuum-tube circuits with a separate power supply unit, using a multi-pin cable and connector. With the advent of solid-state amplification, the power requirements were greatly reduced and it became practical to use the same cable conductors and connector for audio and power. During the 1960s, several powering methods were developed, mainly in Europe. The two dominant methods were initially defined in German DIN 45595 as Tonaderspeisung or T-power and DIN 45596 for phantom power. Since the 1980s, phantom power has become much more common, because the same input may be used for both powered and unpowered microphones. In consumer electronics such as DSLRs and camcorders, plug-in power is more common for microphones using a 3.5 mm phone plug connector. Phantom, T-power and plug-in power are described in international standard IEC 61938.

== Connectors and connectivity ==
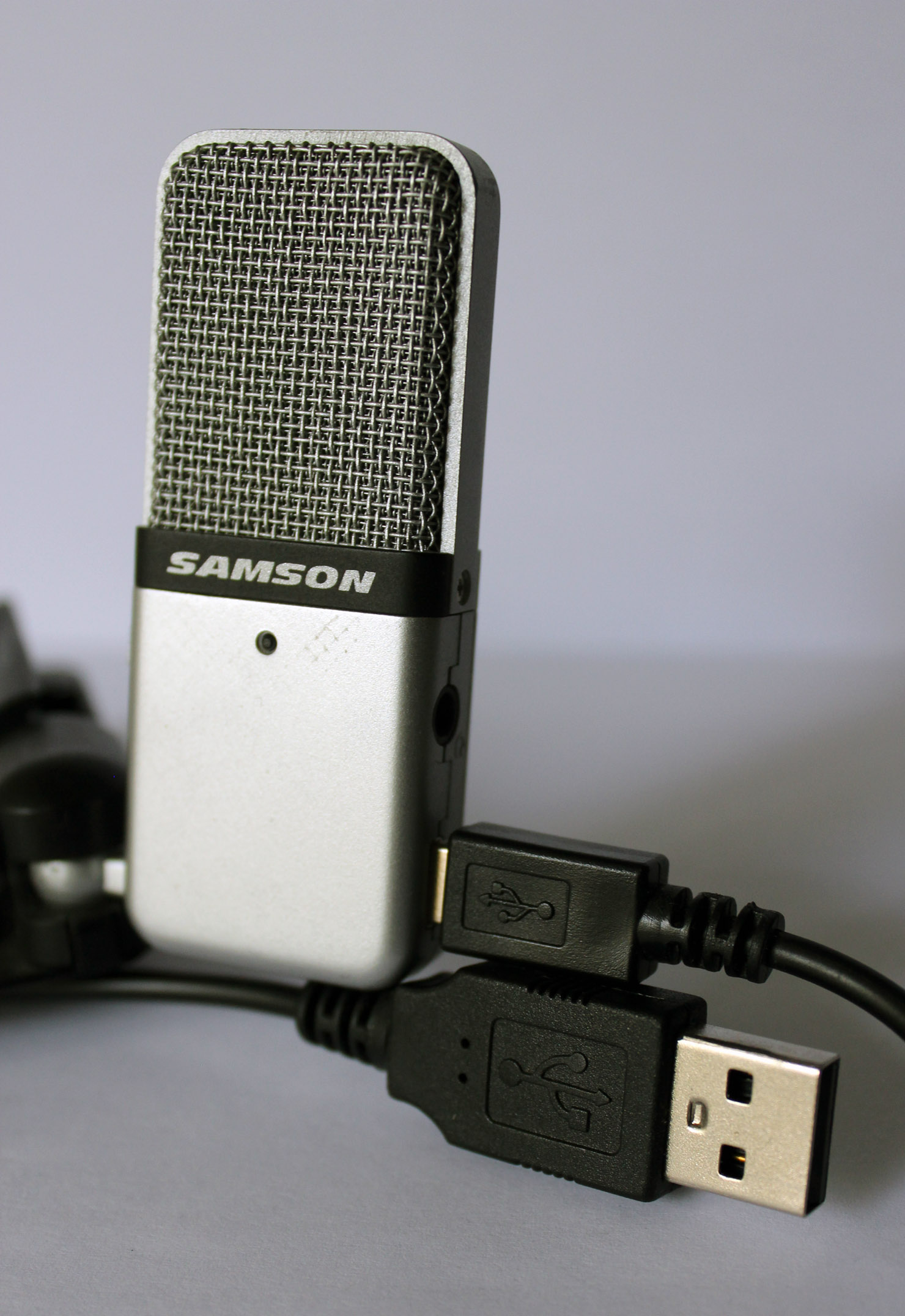
Samson microphone with a USB connector

Electronic symbol for a microphone

The most common connectors used by microphones are:

- Male XLR connector on professional microphones
- 1/4 inch (sometimes referred to as 6.35 mm) phone connector on less expensive musician's microphones, using an unbalanced 1/4 in (6.35 mm) TS (tip and sleeve) phone connector. Harmonica microphones commonly use a high-impedance 1/4 inch TS connection to be run through guitar amplifiers.
- 3.5 mm (sometimes referred to as 1/8 inch mini) TRS (tip, ring and sleeve) stereo (also available as TS mono) mini phone plug on prosumer camera, recorder and computer microphones.
- USB allows direct connection to PCs. Electronics in these microphones powered over the USB connection performs preamplification and ADC before the digital audio data is transferred via the USB interface.

Some microphones use other connectors, such as a 5-pin XLR or mini XLR, for connection to portable equipment. Some lavalier (or lapel, from the days of attaching the microphone to the news reporter's coat lapel) microphones use a proprietary connector for connection to a wireless transmitter, such as a radio pack. Since 2005, professional-quality microphones with USB connections have begun to appear, designed for direct recording into computer-based software.

=== Impedance bridging ===
When choosing a pre-amplifier for a certain microphone, the microphone's impedance must be known. Impedance is a frequency-dependent electrical characteristic, measured in ohms (Ω), that relates voltage to current. When not concerned with power transfer, signals are generally transferred as varying voltages and this is also the case for microphones. To obtain the highest signal amplitude one uses a method called impedance bridging. In this configuration, the output impedance of the microphone should be negligible in comparison with the input impedance of the pre-amplifier (in practice a pre-amp impedance at least 10 times greater than the microphone impedance is recommended). By doing so, the signal is attenuated minimally and almost no power is used in the process.

The main alternative to impedance bridging is impedance matching which maximizes power transfer for a given source impedance. However, this has not been relevant since the early 20th century when amplifiers were very expensive and produced a lot of heat. To reduce the number of amplifiers in telephone lines, power loss needed to be minimal so source and load impedances were matched. A downside to impedance matching is the 6 dB loss in signal that occurs as only half the voltage level appears at the pre-amplifier's input. Certain ribbon and dynamic microphones however, are exceptions, due to the designers' assumption of a certain load impedance being part of the internal electro-acoustical damping circuit of the microphone.

Different microphones can have vastly different impedances and this depends on the design. In passive microphones, this value relates closely to the impedance of the coil (or similar mechanism). In active microphones, this value describes the output impedance of its internal amplifier circuitry.

Low impedance is considered under 600 Ω. Medium impedance is considered between 600 Ω and 10 kΩ. High impedance is above 10 kΩ. Owing to their built-in amplifier, condenser microphones typically have an output impedance between 50 and 200 Ω.

=== Digital microphone interface ===
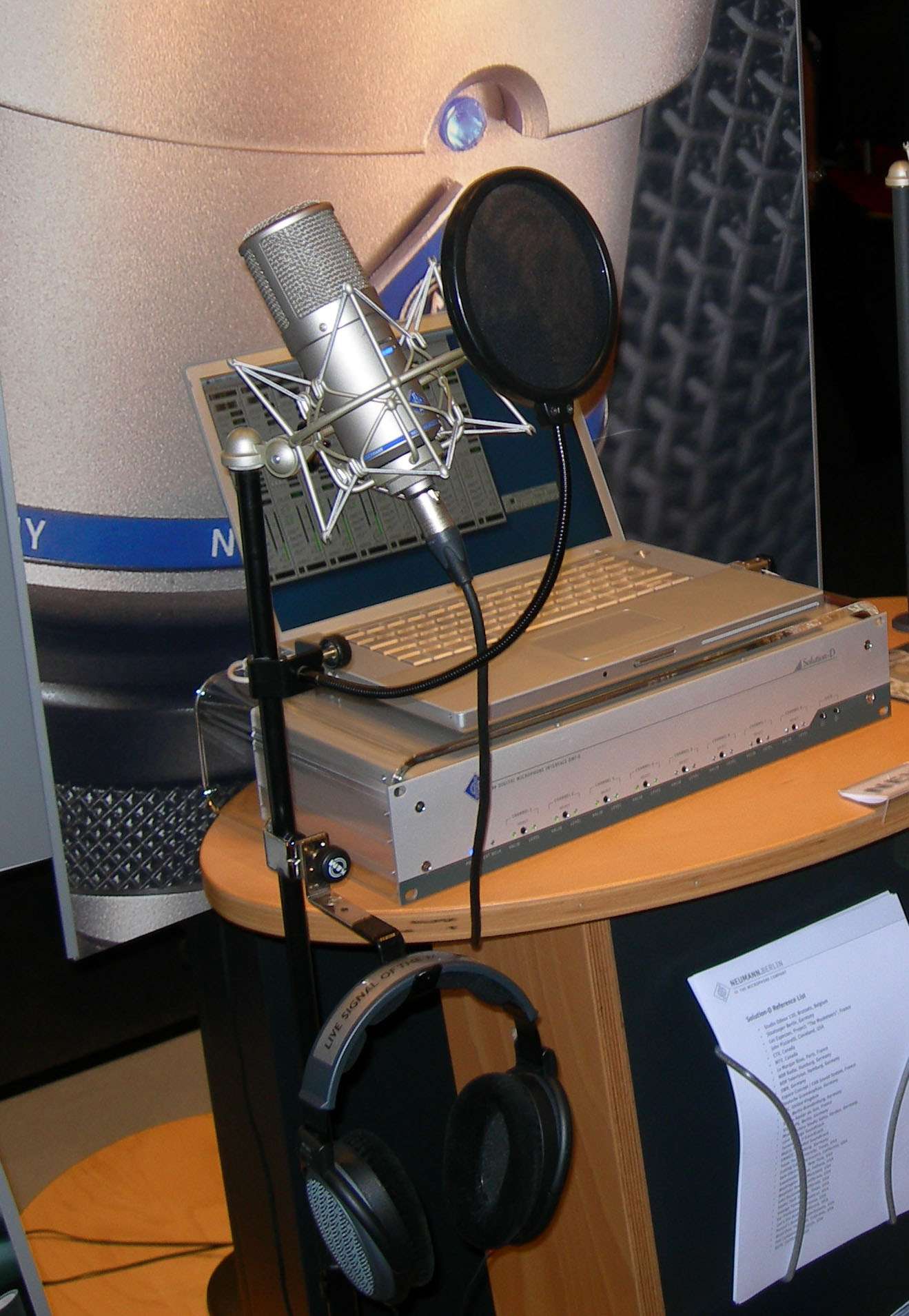
Neumann D-01 digital microphone and Neumann DMI-8 8-channel USB Digital Microphone Interface

The AES42 standard, published by the Audio Engineering Society, defines a digital interface for microphones. Microphones conforming to this standard directly output a digital audio stream through an XLR or XLD male connector, rather than producing an analog output. Digital microphones may be used either with new equipment with appropriate input connections that conform to the AES42 standard, or else via a suitable interface box. Studio-quality microphones that operate in accordance with the AES42 standard are now available from a number of microphone manufacturers.

== Measurements and specifications ==
A comparison of the far field on-axis frequency response of the Oktava 319 and the Shure SM58

Because of differences in their construction, microphones have their own characteristic responses to sound. This difference in response produces non-uniform phase and frequency responses. Additionally, microphones are not uniformly sensitive to sound pressure and can accept differing levels without distorting. Although for scientific applications microphones with a more uniform response are desirable, this is often not the case for music recording, as the non-uniform response of a microphone can produce a desirable coloration of the sound. There is an international standard for microphone specifications, but few manufacturers adhere to it. As a result, comparison of published data from different manufacturers is difficult because different measurement techniques are used. Caution should be used in drawing any solid conclusions from this or any other published data, however, unless it is known that the manufacturer has supplied specifications in accordance with IEC 60268-4.

A frequency response diagram plots the microphone sensitivity in decibels over a range of frequencies (typically 20 Hz to 20 kHz), generally for perfectly on-axis sound (sound arriving at 0° to the capsule). Frequency response may be less informatively stated textually like so: 30 Hz–16 kHz ±3 dB. This is interpreted as meaning a nearly flat, linear plot between the stated frequencies, with variations in amplitude of no more than plus or minus 3 dB. However, one cannot determine from this information how smooth the variations are, nor in what parts of the spectrum they occur. Note that commonly made statements such as "20 Hz–20 kHz" are meaningless without a decibel measure of tolerance. Directional microphones' frequency response varies greatly with distance from the sound source, and with the geometry of the sound source. IEC 60268-4 specifies that frequency response should be measured in plane progressive wave conditions (very far away from the source) but this is seldom practical. Close talking microphones may be measured with different sound sources and distances, but there is no standard and therefore no way to compare data from different models unless the measurement technique is described.

The self-noise or equivalent input noise level is the sound level that creates the same output voltage as the microphone does in the absence of sound. This represents the lowest point of the microphone's dynamic range, and is particularly important should you wish to record sounds that are quiet. The measure is often stated in dB(A), which is the equivalent loudness of the noise on a decibel scale frequency-weighted for how the ear hears, for example: 15 dBA SPL (SPL means sound pressure level relative to 20 micropascals). The lower the number, the better. Some microphone manufacturers state the noise level using ITU-R 468 noise weighting, which more accurately represents the way we hear noise, but gives a figure some 11–14 dB higher. A quiet microphone typically measures 20 dBA SPL or 32 dB SPL 468-weighted. Very quiet microphones have existed for years for special applications, such as the Brüel & Kjaer 4179, with a noise level around 0 dB SPL. Recently some microphones with low noise specifications have been introduced in the studio/entertainment market, such as models from Neumann and Røde that advertise noise levels between 5–7 dBA. Typically this is achieved by altering the frequency response of the capsule and electronics to result in lower noise within the A-weighting curve while broadband noise may be increased.

The clipping level is an important indicator of maximum usable level, as the 1% total harmonic distortion (THD) figure usually quoted under max SPL is really a very mild level of distortion, quite inaudible especially on brief high peaks. Clipping is much more audible. For some microphones, the clipping level may be much higher than the max SPL.

The dynamic range of a microphone is the difference in SPL between the noise floor and the maximum SPL. If stated on its own, for example, "120 dB", it conveys significantly less information than having the self-noise and maximum SPL figures individually.

Sensitivity indicates how well the microphone converts acoustic pressure to an output voltage. A high sensitivity microphone creates more voltage and so needs less amplification at the mixer or recording device. This is a practical concern but is not directly an indication of the microphone's quality, and in fact the term sensitivity is something of a misnomer, transduction gain being perhaps more meaningful (or just output level) because true sensitivity is generally set by the noise floor, and too much sensitivity in terms of output level compromises the clipping level. There are two common measures. The (preferred) international standard is made in millivolts per pascal at 1 kHz. A higher value indicates greater sensitivity. The older American method is referred to as a 1 V/Pa standard and measured in plain decibels, resulting in a negative value. Again, a higher value indicates greater sensitivity, so −60 dB is more sensitive than −70 dB.

== Measurement microphones ==
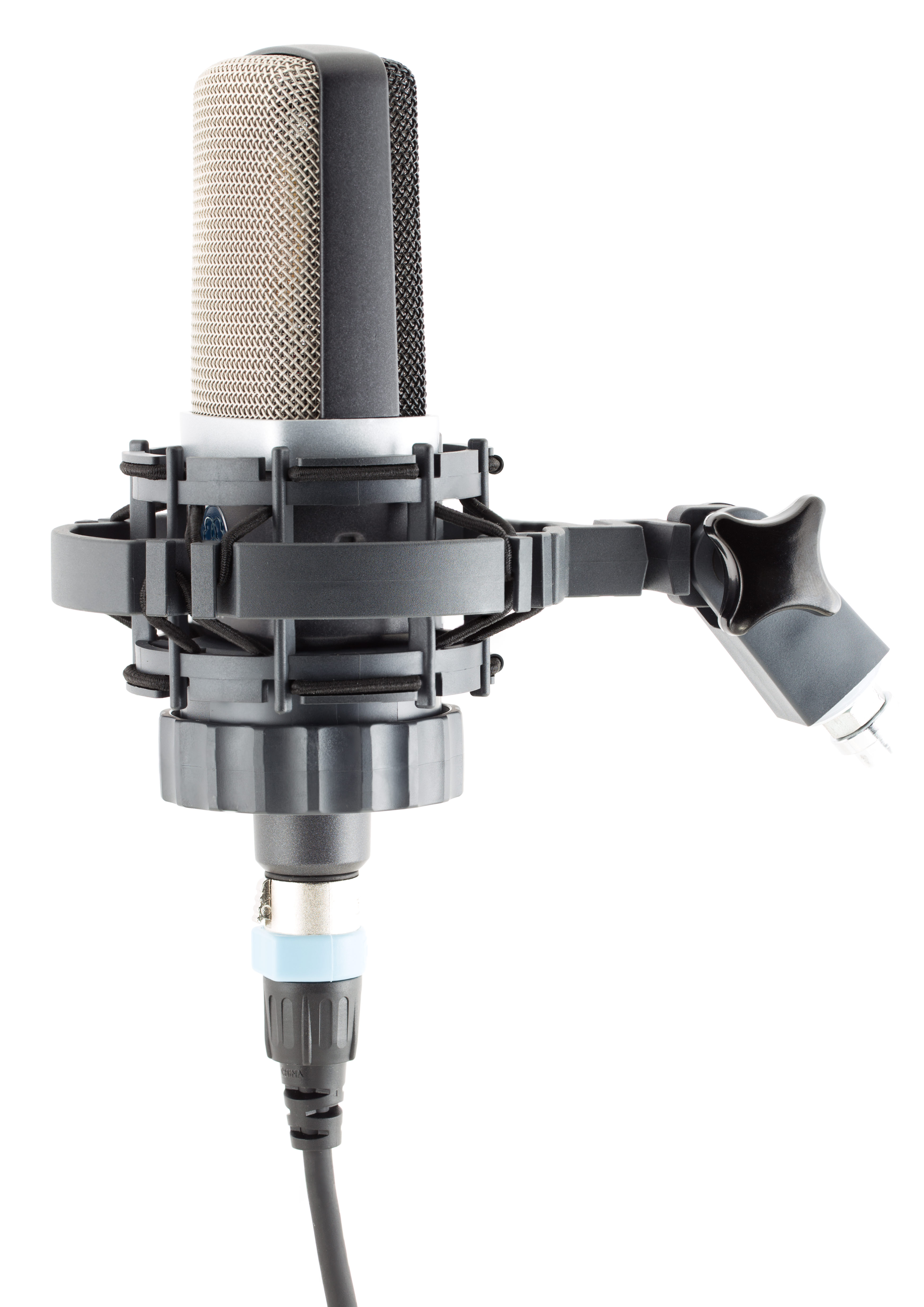
An AKG C214 condenser microphone with shock mount

Some microphones are intended for testing speakers, measuring noise levels and otherwise quantifying an acoustic experience. These are calibrated transducers and are usually supplied with a calibration certificate that states absolute sensitivity against frequency. The quality of measurement microphones is often referred to using the designations: Class 1, Type 2, etc., which are references not to microphone specifications but to sound level meters. A more comprehensive standard for the description of measurement microphone performance was recently adopted.

Measurement microphones are generally scalar sensors of pressure; they exhibit an omnidirectional response, limited only by the scattering profile of their physical dimensions. Sound intensity or sound power measurements require pressure-gradient measurements, which are typically made using arrays of at least two microphones, or with hot-wire anemometers.

=== Calibration ===
To take a scientific measurement with a microphone, its precise sensitivity must be known (in volts per pascal). Since this may change over the lifetime of the device, it is necessary to regularly calibrate measurement microphones. This service is offered by some microphone manufacturers and by independent certified testing labs. All microphone calibration is ultimately traceable to primary standards at a national measurement institute such as NPL in the UK, PTB in Germany and NIST in the United States, which most commonly calibrate using the reciprocity primary standard. Measurement microphones calibrated using this method can then be used to calibrate other microphones using comparison calibration techniques.

Depending on the application, measurement microphones must be tested periodically (every year or several months, typically) and after any potentially damaging event, such as being dropped (most such microphones come in foam-padded cases to reduce this risk) or exposed to sounds beyond the acceptable level.

== Arrays ==
A microphone array is any number of microphones operating in tandem. There are many applications:

- Systems for extracting voice input from ambient noise (notably telephones, speech recognition systems, hearing aids)
- Surround sound and related technologies
- Locating objects by sound: acoustic source localization (e.g. military use to locate the source(s) of artillery fire). Aircraft location and tracking.
- High fidelity original recordings
- 3D spatial beamforming for localized acoustic detection of subcutaneous sounds

Typically, an array is made up of omnidirectional microphones distributed about the perimeter of a space, linked to a computer that records and interprets the results into a coherent form.

== Windscreens ==
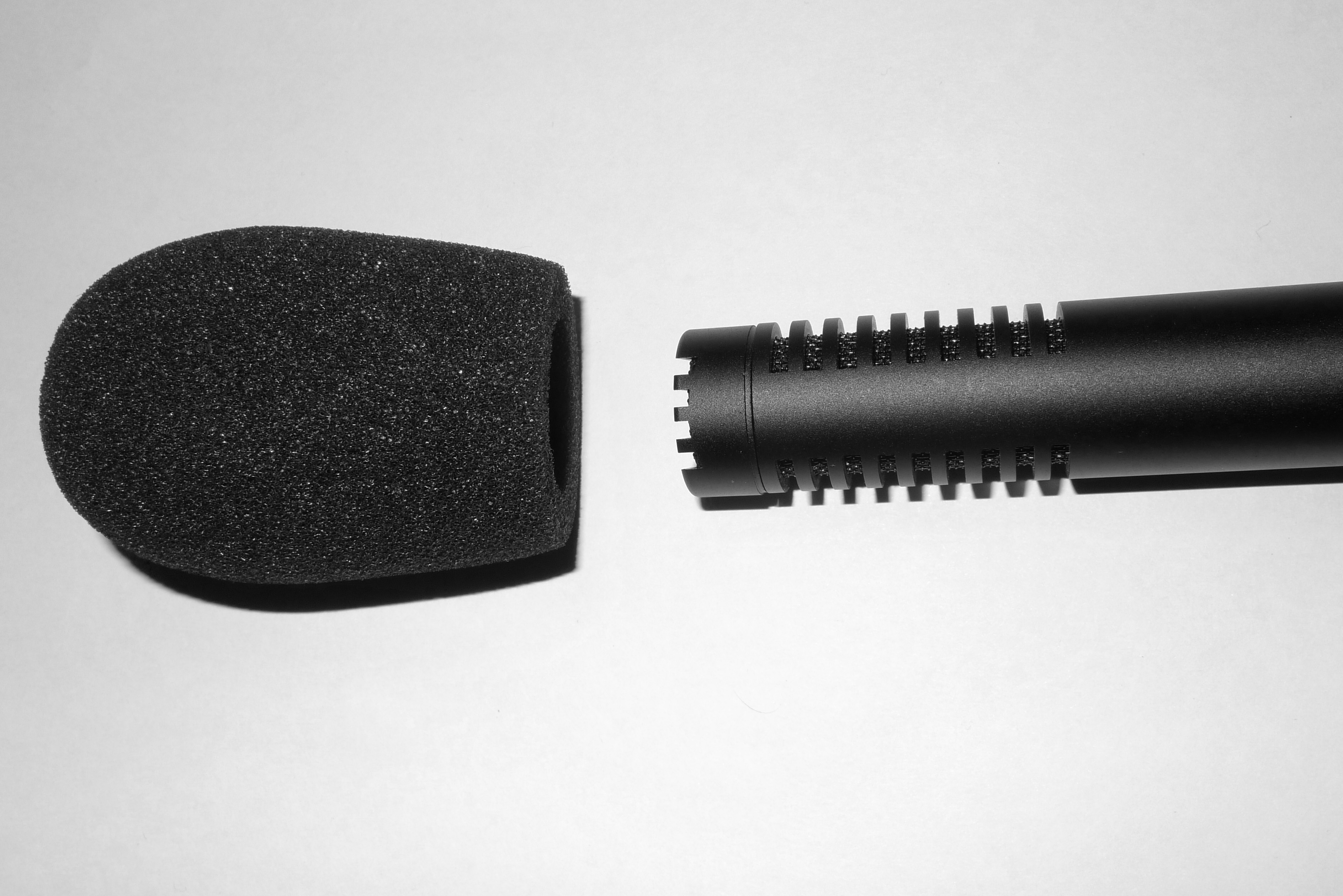
Microphone with its windscreen removed

Windscreens (or interchangeably, windshields) provide a method of reducing the effect of wind on microphones. While pop-screens give protection from unidirectional blasts, foam hats shield wind into the grille from all directions, and blimps, zeppelins, and baskets entirely enclose the microphone and protect its body as well. The latter is important because, given the extreme low-frequency content of wind noise, vibration induced in the housing of the microphone can contribute substantially to the noise output.

The shielding material used – wire gauze, fabric or foam – is designed to have a significant acoustic impedance. The relatively low particle-velocity air pressure changes that constitute sound waves can pass through with minimal attenuation, but higher particle-velocity wind is impeded to a far greater extent. Increasing the thickness of the material increases wind attenuation but also begins to compromise high-frequency audio content. This limits the practical size of simple foam screens. While foams and wire meshes can be partly or wholly self-supporting, soft fabrics and gauzes require stretching on frames or laminating with coarser structural elements.

Since all wind noise is generated at the first surface the air hits, the greater the spacing between the shield periphery and microphone capsule, the greater the noise attenuation. For an approximately spherical shield, attenuation increases by (approximately) the cube of that distance. With full basket windshields, there is an additional pressure chamber effect, first explained by Joerg Wuttke, which, for two-port (pressure gradient) microphones, allows the shield and microphone combination to act as a high-pass acoustic filter.

Since turbulence at a surface is the source of wind noise, reducing gross turbulence can add to noise reduction. Both aerodynamically smooth surfaces and ones that prevent powerful vortices from being generated have been used successfully. Historically, artificial fur has proved very useful for this purpose since the fibers produce micro-turbulence and absorb energy silently. If not matted by wind and rain, the fur fibers are very transparent acoustically, but the woven or knitted backing can give significant attenuation. As a material, it suffers from being difficult to manufacture with consistency and is hard to keep in pristine condition on location. Thus, there is an interest in moving away from its use.

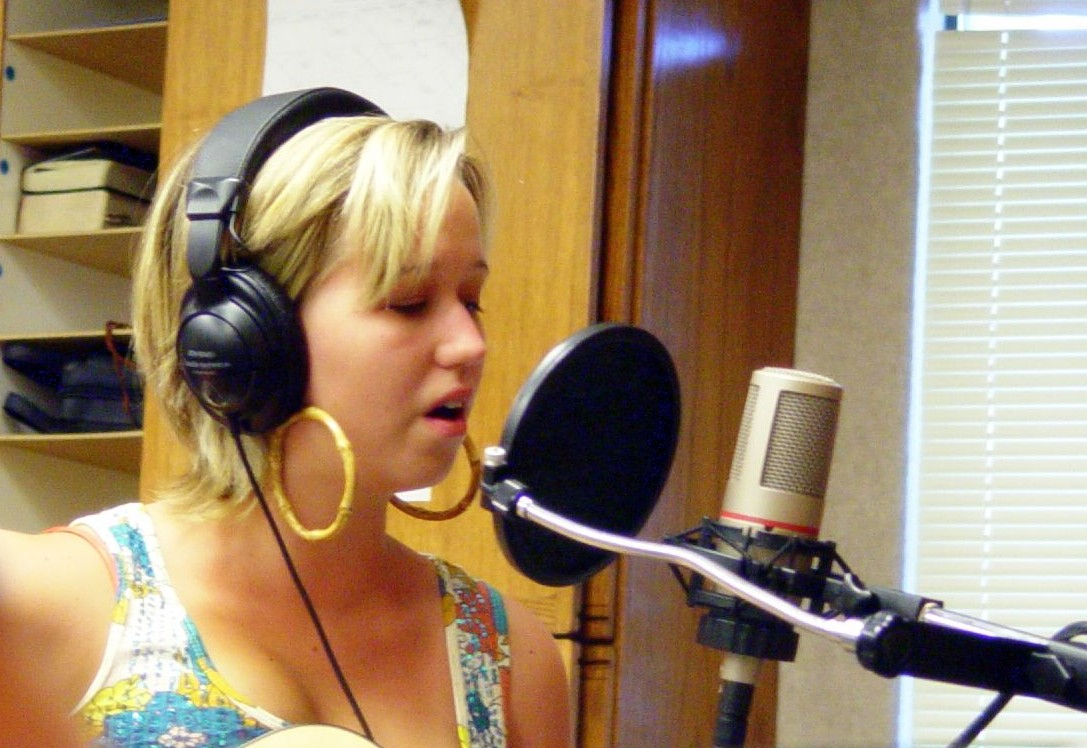
Singer and disc pop filter in front of a large-diaphragm condenser mic

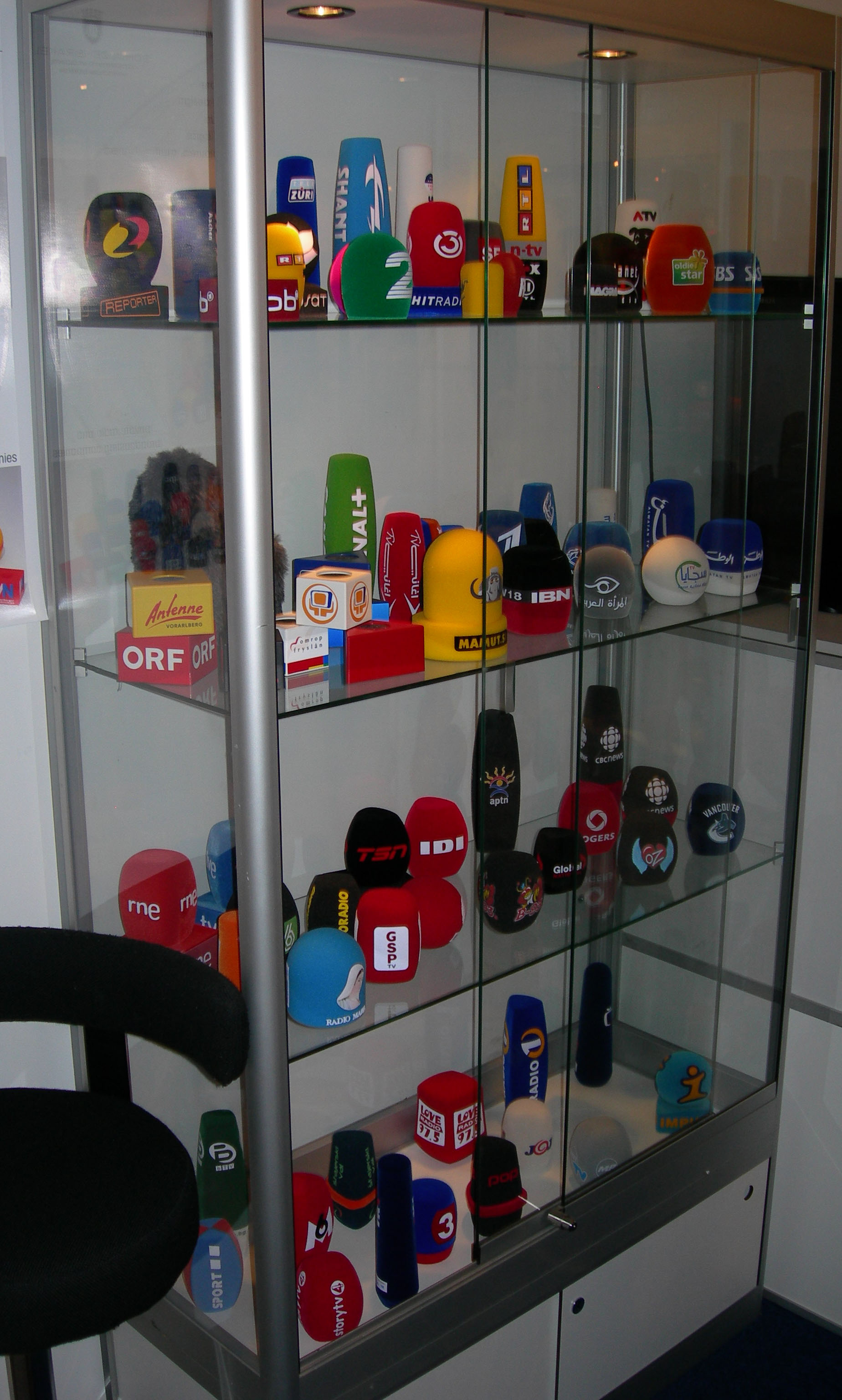
Various microphone covers

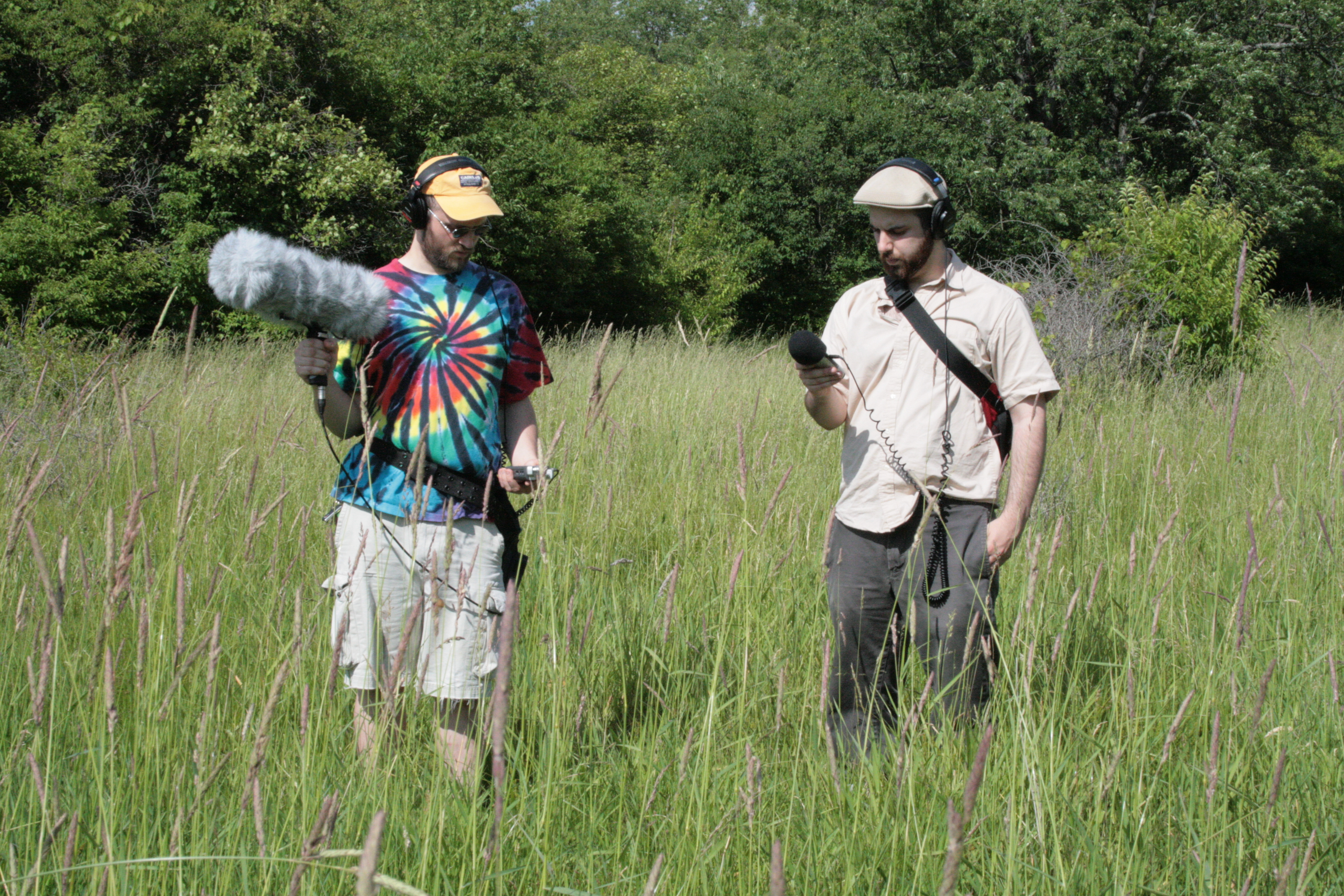
Two recordings being made—a blimp is being used on the left. An open-cell foam windscreen is being used on the right.

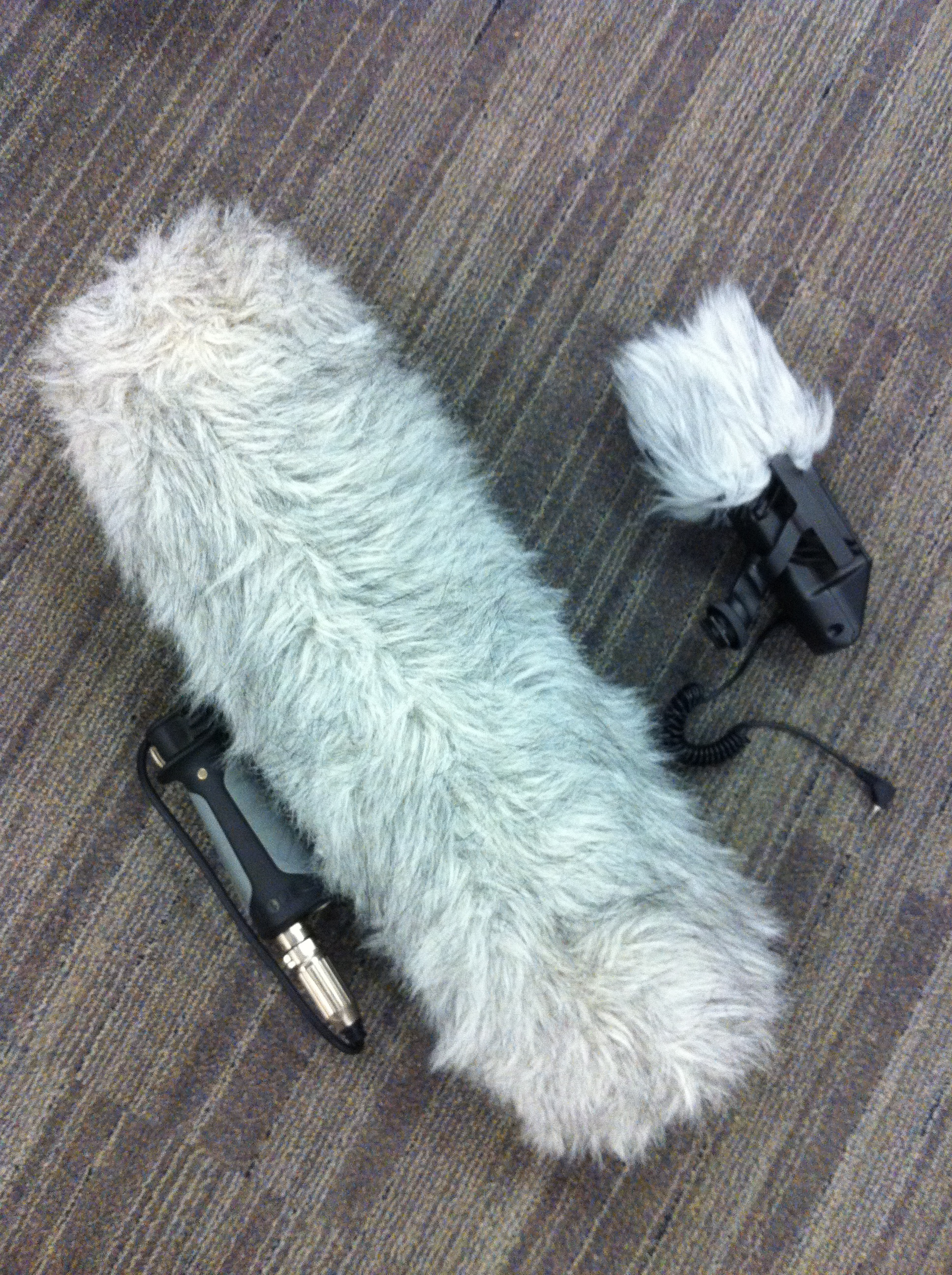
Dead cat and a dead kitten windscreens. The dead kitten covers a stereo microphone for a DSLR camera. The difference in name is due to the size of the enclosure.

== See also ==
- Geophone – transducer for sound within the earth
- Hydrophone – transducer for sound in water
- Ionophone – plasma-based microphone
- Microphone blocker – computer accessory for disabling internal microphone.
- Microphone connector
- Nominal impedance
