= Optoacoustics =

Optoacoustics may refer to:

- Optoacoustics Ltd
- Multispectral optoacoustic tomography
- Photoacoustic imaging
