= Radio pack =

Small radio transmitter used by musicians

A radio pack is mainly used for musicians such as guitarists and singers for live performances. It is a small radio transmitter that is either placed in the strap or in the pocket. The receiver is connected to an amp or PA system and the user simply connects the transmitter into the instrument. By using a Wireless system, musicians are free to move around the stage. This has meant that more elaborate stage shows are now possible, with musicians performing a long way from the amplifier or speakers.

As with any radio device interference is possible, although modern systems are more stable. An example of a performer who has made use of a radio pack is AC/DC guitarist Angus Young, whose stage antics are legendary.

== See also ==
- Schaffer–Vega diversity system - one wireless guitar system
