= Optoacoustics Ltd =

- Type: Private
- Founded: 2006
- Headquarters: Or Yehuda, Israel
- Key people: Dr. Yuvi Kahana; Dr. Alexander Kots; Dr. Alexander Paritsky
- Products: High performance optical sensing products and communications systems

Optoacoustics Ltd is a private company that makes fiber optic-based acoustic microphones, fiber optic microphones, headphones, accelerometers, sensors, telephony accessories, and other components, primarily for medical, industrial, environmental and research applications.

== History ==
Established in 2006, Optoacoustics' founders are the inventors of the original fiber optical microphone. The company pioneered the microphone's commercial manufacture, which is now in its third generation.

In 2008, Optoacoustics began installing the first fully optical fiber-based communication systems for interventional magnetic resonance imaging (iMRI) at leading U.S. research and clinical hospitals. This system enables doctors, staff and patients to converse normally while performing complex MRI medical procedures, safely abating noise levels of more than 120 dB commonly found in these environments.

Optoacoustics' fiber optical microphones are also used in functional Magnetic Resonance Imaging (fMRI) environments to enable brain researchers to better understand the underlying workings of human speech and communications.

Optoacoustics' products combine two physical disciplines, optics and acoustics, to meet requirements which cannot be addressed by conventional sensing. In particular, Optoacoustics products do not react to or influence any electrical, magnetic, electrostatic or radioactive fields, offering complete EMI/RFI immunity. The company's technology is protected by over 20 international patents.

== Products ==
- Microphones
- Headphones and headsets
- Accelerometers
- Vibration sensors
- Communications systems with EMI/RFI immunity
