= Microphone connector =

Electrical connectors for microphones

Many different electrical connectors have been used to connect microphones to audio equipment—including PA systems, radios, tape recorders, and numerous other devices.

== Phone connectors ==
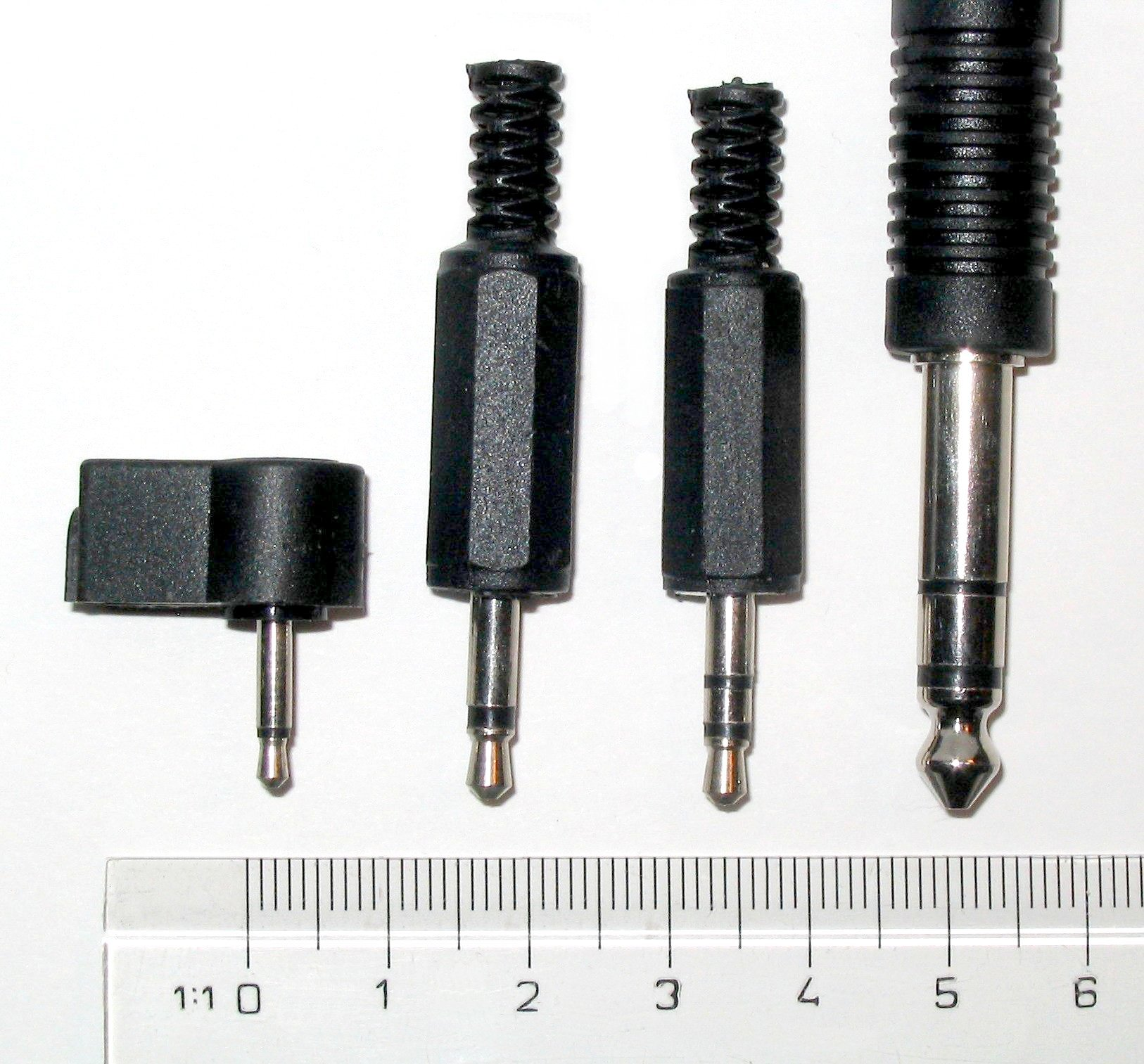
2.5 mm mono (TS), 3.5 mm mono and stereo (TRS), and 1/4 inch (6.4 mm) stereo (TRS) phone connectors

The most common microphone connector in consumer use is the venerable phone connector, in 1/4 inch (6.4 mm), 3.5 mm, and 2.5 mm sizes, and in both mono and stereo configurations. Not all microphone plugs with 3-segment TRS (Tip-Ring-Sleeve) connectors are actually stereo. Most computer microphones use the third segment to carry bias power for the microphone.

== XLR connectors (mid-50s to today) ==
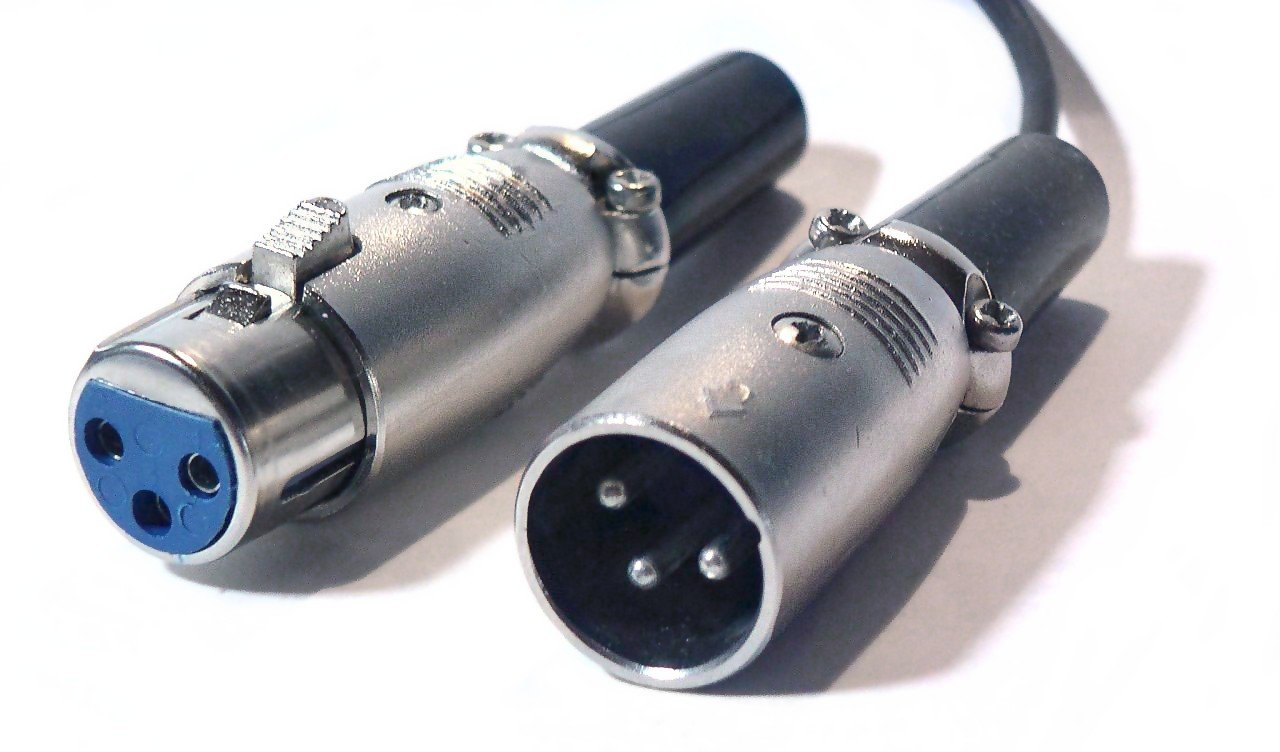
XLR3 cable connectors, female on left and male on right

Most commonly used on professional microphones, the common 3-pin XLR connector is a standard for transferring balanced audio among professional audio equipment.

The 4-pin XLR is the standard connector for intercom headsets, such as systems made by Clear-Com and Telex. Two pins are used for the mono headphone signal and two pins for the unbalanced microphone signal.

The 4-pin XLR connector is also commonly used on amateur radio microphones, but transferring unbalanced audio instead, and using the 4th pin (with the common ground) for a push-to-talk (PTT) circuit activated by a button on the microphone. Some broadcast radio professionals also use these microphones, instead using the PTT circuit as a cough button (a momentary mute button) so that they may cough, clear their throat, or make comments to others in the studio without the sounds being broadcast. It is also used for dmx512 digital stage controls.

== Multi-pin circular connector (Marushin, MCC, CBC series, Foster, GX-16) ==
First used in the 1970s by Japanese radio manufacturers as an alternative to the German DIN connector standard for microphone connectors on citizens band and amateur radio equipment, these screw-on circular connectors are available with 2, 3, 4, 5, 6, 7, or 8 pins. They are often used for other purposes as well, for example, 2-pin connectors used for DC power in 1970s Kenwood mobile radios and soldering stations from Eastern Asian manufacturers in the 1990s using the connector for the iron/handpiece.

Marushing Electric Mfg. Co., Ltd. in Kanagawa, Japan, the original 1950s producer of the connector type, still continues manufacturing. Japanese communications equipment manufacturers such as Icom and Yaesu Musen have used Marushin connectors in their products.
