= Shure SM7 =

Professional broadcasting microphone

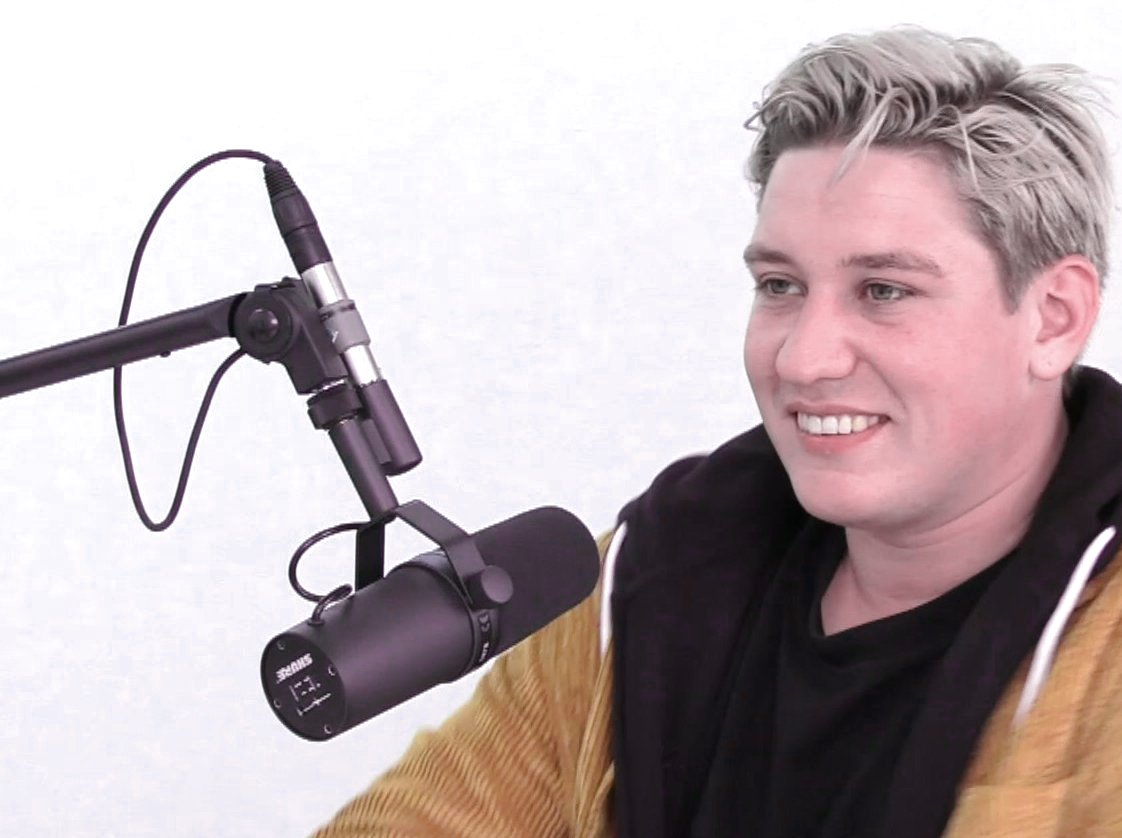
Shure SM7B microphone used in an interview with Marius Bear

The Shure SM7 is a professional cardioid dynamic microphone, commonly used in broadcasting applications since 1973. Designed by Shure, it has been described as an "iconic" industry standard microphone for its focused, directional sound and its widespread adoption in radio, television and recording studios. In 2007–2008, the SM7B model became popular for professional podcasting.

== Development ==
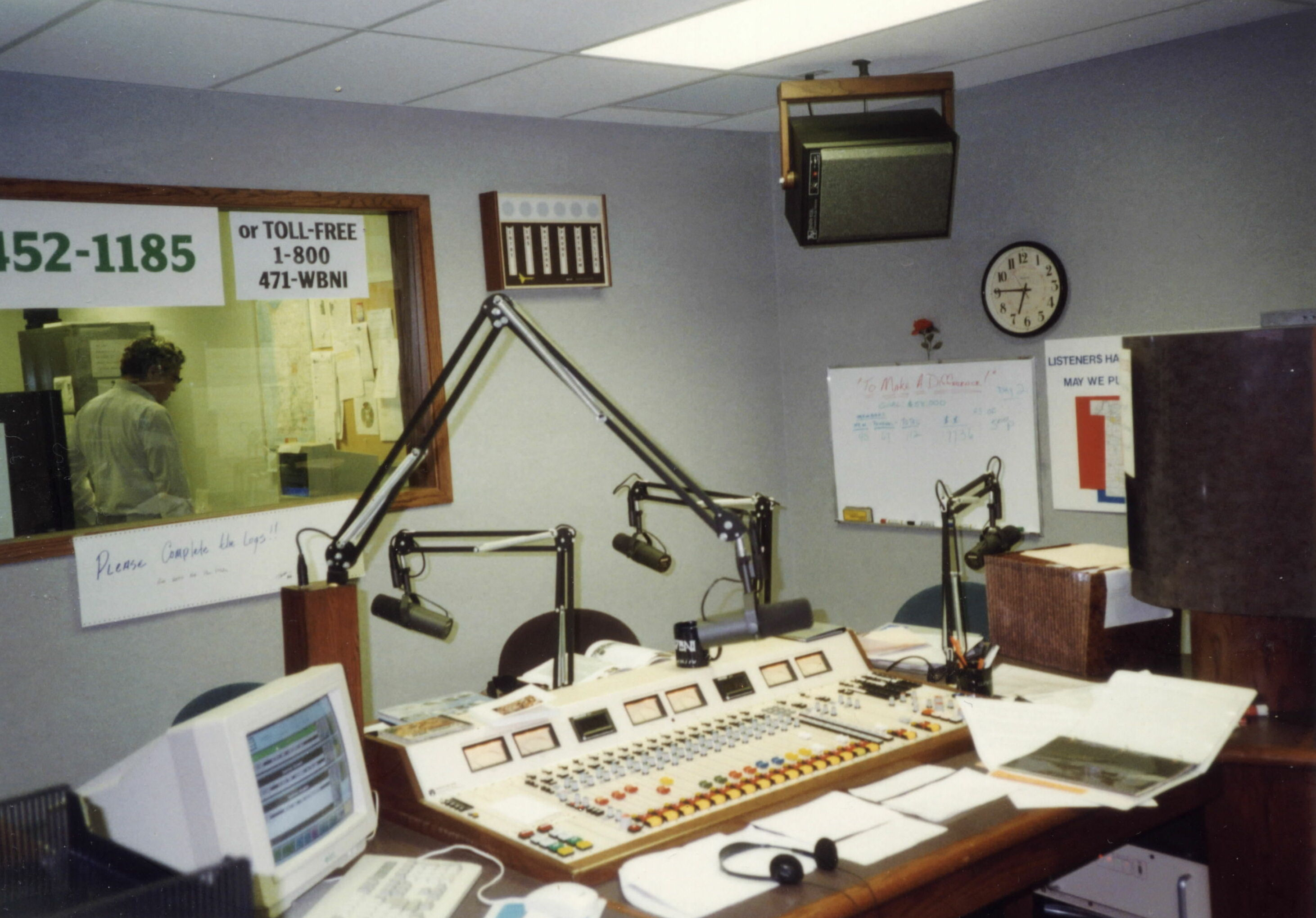
Radio station WBNI-FM with four SM7s on boom arms

Shure designed the Unidyne microphone element in 1939, then greatly improved it in 1959, based on research and development by Shure engineer Ernie Seeler. The smaller Unidyne III appeared six years later, designed by Seeler to be the transducer inside the SM series of microphones, including the popular SM56, SM57 and SM58, used live on stage and in the recording studio. "SM" stands for "Studio Microphone".

Adapting the Unidyne III element for increased bass response, Seeler designed the large and heavy SM5 microphone in 1966, intended for broadcasting applications such as for announcers in radio stations and television studios. In 1973, the SM5 was updated and reduced in size to become the SM7, which was widely adopted in radio and TV, but occasionally used in recording studios. Compared to the SM57, the SM7 has a flatter (more neutral) frequency response, but also has two recessed switches for tailoring the response curve. One switch is a high-pass filter to reduce low frequency rumble, and the other is a mid-frequency reduction to attenuate and flatten out the SM7's inherent "presence" peak.

In 1999, the SM7A model appeared with extra shielding against electromagnetic interference (for instance, from television CRTs). In 2001, the SM7B model added a larger windscreen to reduce breathy plosives.

Two decades later, in 2023, Shure added to its product line the SM7dB model with a built-in preamplifier to improve the low output of previous models without the need for an external amplifier. For about $100 USD more, it incorporated circuit design licensed from the popular Cloudlifter external preamp.

== Broadcast ==
Fictional radio deejay Chris Stevens (John Corbett) uses an SM7 without the windscreen on the television show Northern Exposure.

The SM7 is one of three very popular microphones in radio and television stations, used by DJs and voice-over announcers. The other two are the American Electro-Voice RE20 (1968) and the German Sennheiser MD 421 (1960). The Sennheiser and Electro-Voice models are used widely on the concert stage and in recording studios. The EV RE20 was updated to the RE27N/D.

Portrayed on television in the early 1990s, the SM7 was seen in the series about the fictional town of Cicely, Alaska: Northern Exposure with KHBR radio deejay Chris Stevens (John Corbett) providing commentary and narration for each episode. The microphone was used without its windscreen, revealing the extended metal grille protecting the microphone element. The typical radio station mounts the microphone in this manner, hanging from a robust boom arm extending out over the workspace.

== Music ==
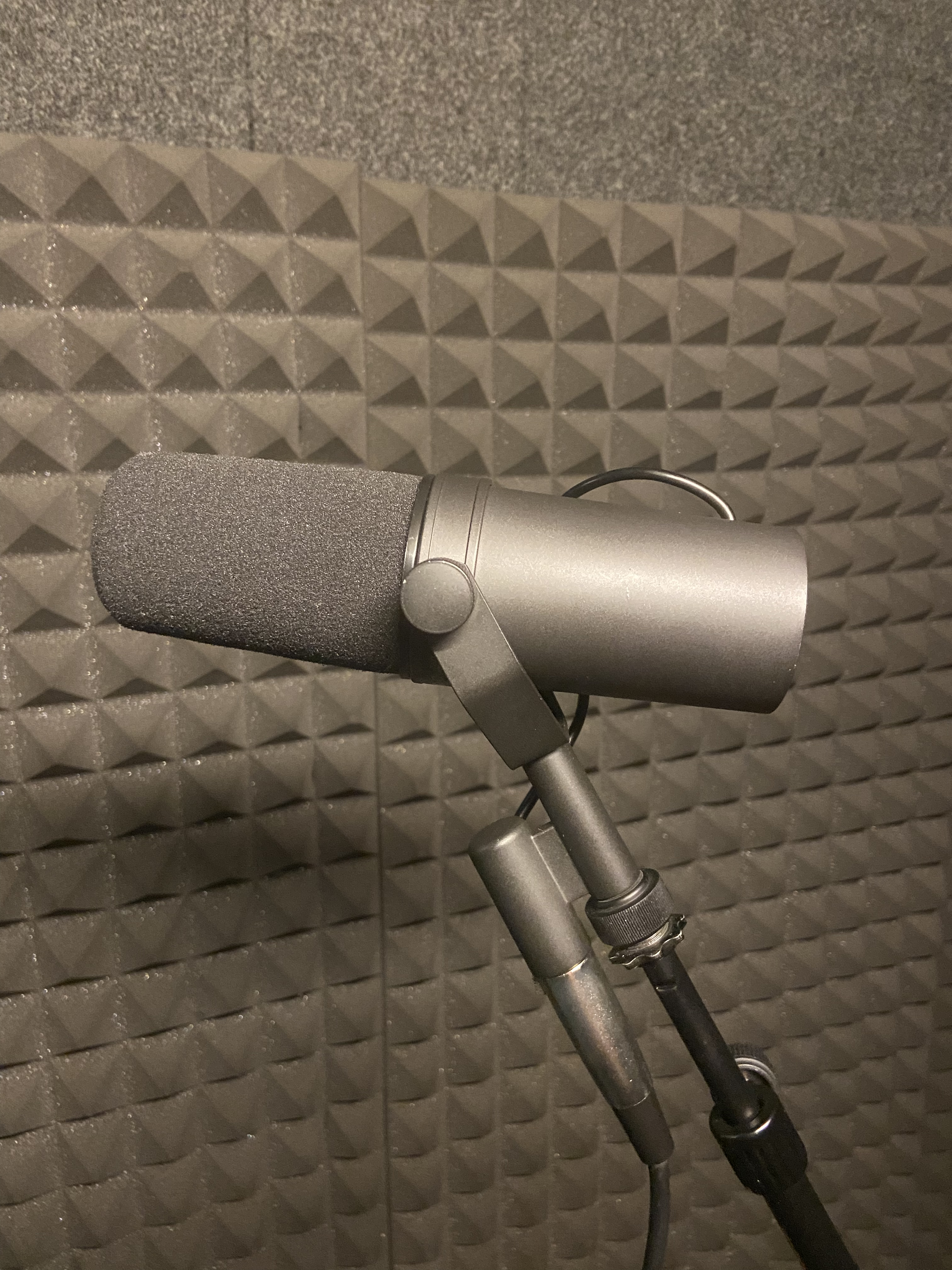
A Shure SM7 in a recording studio

The wide frequency response of the SM7, and its ability to withstand high sound pressure level (SPL), have led audio engineers to use it in the recording studio, to pick up a variety of sources such as horns, vocals, electric guitar and bass guitar amplifiers, and parts of the drum kit—especially bass drum or "kick". The Rolling Stones' Mick Jagger's vocals were recorded in the mid-1970s with two microphones—an SM7 and a condenser microphone—with one or the other chosen during mixdown, or a combination of the two.

Engineer-producer Bruce Swedien used several microphones including the SM7 to record Michael Jackson's vocals for Thriller in 1982. The SM7 was the only vocal microphone on "P.Y.T. (Pretty Young Thing)", and was probably used for "Billie Jean", according to Swedien's session notes. Swedien owned six SM7s, and was a big fan of its sound. He also used the SM7 in 1981 for James Ingram singing "Just Once".

Because it can handle high dynamic range, the SM7 has been used for heavy metal vocalists. The 1982 album The Number of the Beast by Iron Maiden employed an SM7 for the vocals of Bruce Dickinson. In 2001–2003, the SM7 was used to record the voice of singer-guitarist James Hetfield for the Metallica album St. Anger, as seen in the documentary Metallica: Some Kind of Monster. The 2008 Black Ice album by AC/DC was supervised by producer Mike Fraser who chose the SM7 for Brian Johnson's "crooning" vocals.

Other recordings using the SM7 include Jack White of the White Stripes working with engineer Joe Chiccarelli starting with Icky Thump in 2007, and engineer Michael Barbiero choosing the SM7 in combination with other microphones for Whitney Houston in 1983–1984, heard on her debut album in 1985. Bassist-engineer Michael Bradford put an SM7 in front of Kid Rock for the album "The History of Rock" in 2000; he had learned of the SM7 from Gerard Smerek who used it on Bob Seger and Anita Baker. Sheryl Crow sang into an SM7 for The Globe Sessions in 1998, and Bob Dylan has recorded with it, starting with Love and Theft engineered by Chris Shaw in 2001. The vocals of Red Hot Chili Peppers' Anthony Kiedis throughout the majority of "Blood Sugar Sex Magik" album were recorded into an SM7 in 1991, as were the vocals of Maroon 5's Adam Levine on "This Love", recorded in 2002. Donald Glover used the SM7 for some songs on the Childish Gambino Camp album in 2011.

== Podcast ==
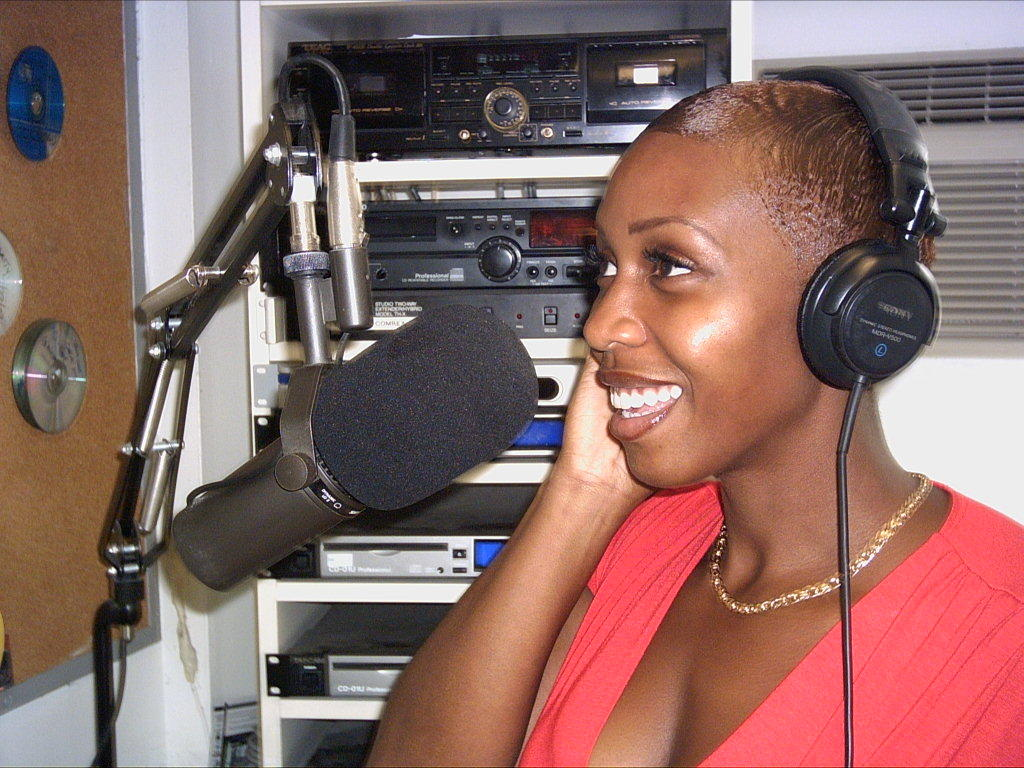
Radio station guest interview

The SM7 was largely unknown outside of professional audio circles until it began to be used for podcasting in the mid-2000s. The early podcasters shared equipment ideas, and the SM7B gained a new audience. The microphone was used for the podcasts of 99% Invisible, The Joe Rogan Experience, My Favorite Murder, WTF with Marc Maron, Snap Judgment, Song Exploder and more. In 2014, gamers and streamers began using the SM7B, including Shroud.

The podcast Twenty Thousand Hertz dedicated an episode to the SM7 in May 2021, written by Andrew Anderson, calling it an "iconic" microphone with highly directional sound.

The success of the SM7B in professional podcasting applications led Shure to devise a new microphone for home podcasters and streamers. In 2020, Shure introduced the MV7 model, keeping the style of the SM7 but reducing it in size, designing a completely new transducer element with greater acoustic isolation, and providing it with active digital audio circuitry, connecting via USB cable. The MV7 swiftly picked up a large share of the home podcasting market, and was named the best podcast microphone by Rolling Stone magazine in 2021.

== Specifications: SM7B ==
Type: Dynamic (moving coil)

Frequency response
50 to 20,000 Hz
Polar pattern
Cardioid
Sensitivity (at 1,000 Hz open circuit voltage)
−59 dBV/Pa (1.12 mV)
Impedance
150 ohms
Polarity
Positive pressure on diaphragm produces positive voltage on pin 2 relative to pin 3
Connector
Three-pin male XLR
Switches
Bass-rolloff (high-pass filter) and mid-range boost
Net weight
765.4 grams (27.00 oz)

== See also ==
- Shure Beta 58A
