= Shure SM57 =

Dynamic microphone

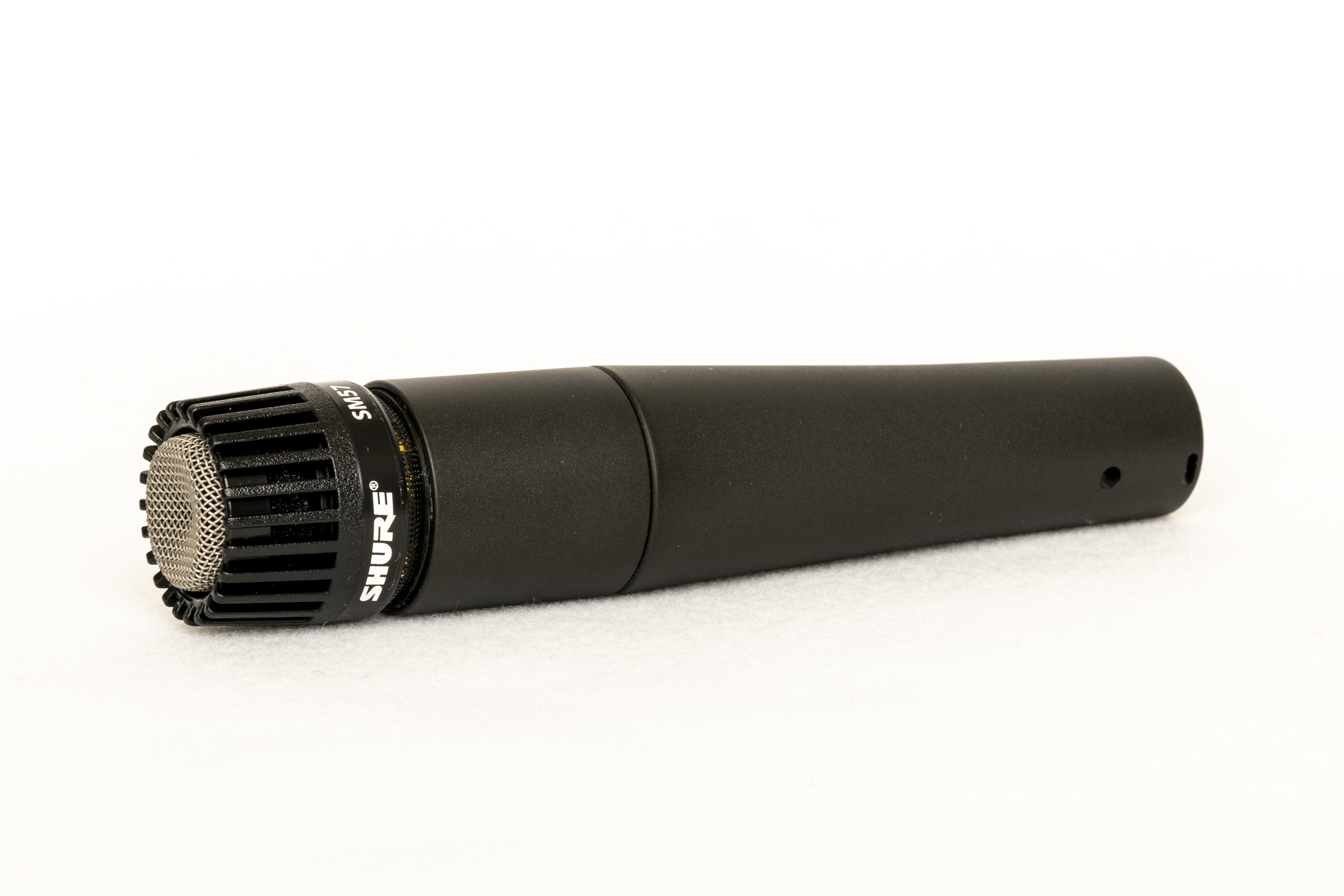
The Shure SM57 microphone

The Shure SM57 is a low-impedance cardioid dynamic microphone made by Shure Incorporated and commonly used in live sound reinforcement and studio recording. It is one of the best-selling microphones in the world. It is used extensively in amplified music and has been used for speeches by every U.S. president since its introduction in 1965. In 2004, honoring its four decades of "solid, dependable performance", it was inducted into the first-ever TEC Awards TECnology Hall of Fame.

== Background ==
The origin of SM57 may be traced to 1937, when Shure engineer Benjamin Bauer developed the first single-element directional microphone, the Unidyne, which had a cardioid pickup pattern. In 1959, another Shure engineer, Ernie Seeler, advanced the art of microphone design significantly with the Unidyne III capsule which was later used in the SM57. After three years of research and development, which encompassed various torture tests, the result was the creation of the SM series of rugged and reliable Shure microphones. The "SM" stands for Studio Microphone; Seeler was an aficionado of classical music and expected the SM57 to be used for orchestras. Because he "despised" rock music, the TEC Foundation said that it was ironic that the microphone has become "a mainstay of rock music."

== Characteristics ==
The SM57 uses the same capsule as the popular SM58. Like the SM58, the SM57 is fitted with an XLR connector and is impedance balanced, which helps to minimize electrical hum and noise pickup when connected to a balanced input. Compared to the SM58, the SM57's grille allows for closer placement to the source of sound, while the SM58 provides a pop filter to reduce plosives ("pop" sounds) and wind. According to Shure, the SM57 frequency response extends from 40 hertz (Hz) to 15 kHz. It is manufactured in the United States, Mexico, and China.

The Shure A2WS is an accessory windscreen for the SM57 that attenuates wind noise and plosives, and protects the microphone capsule.

== Use ==
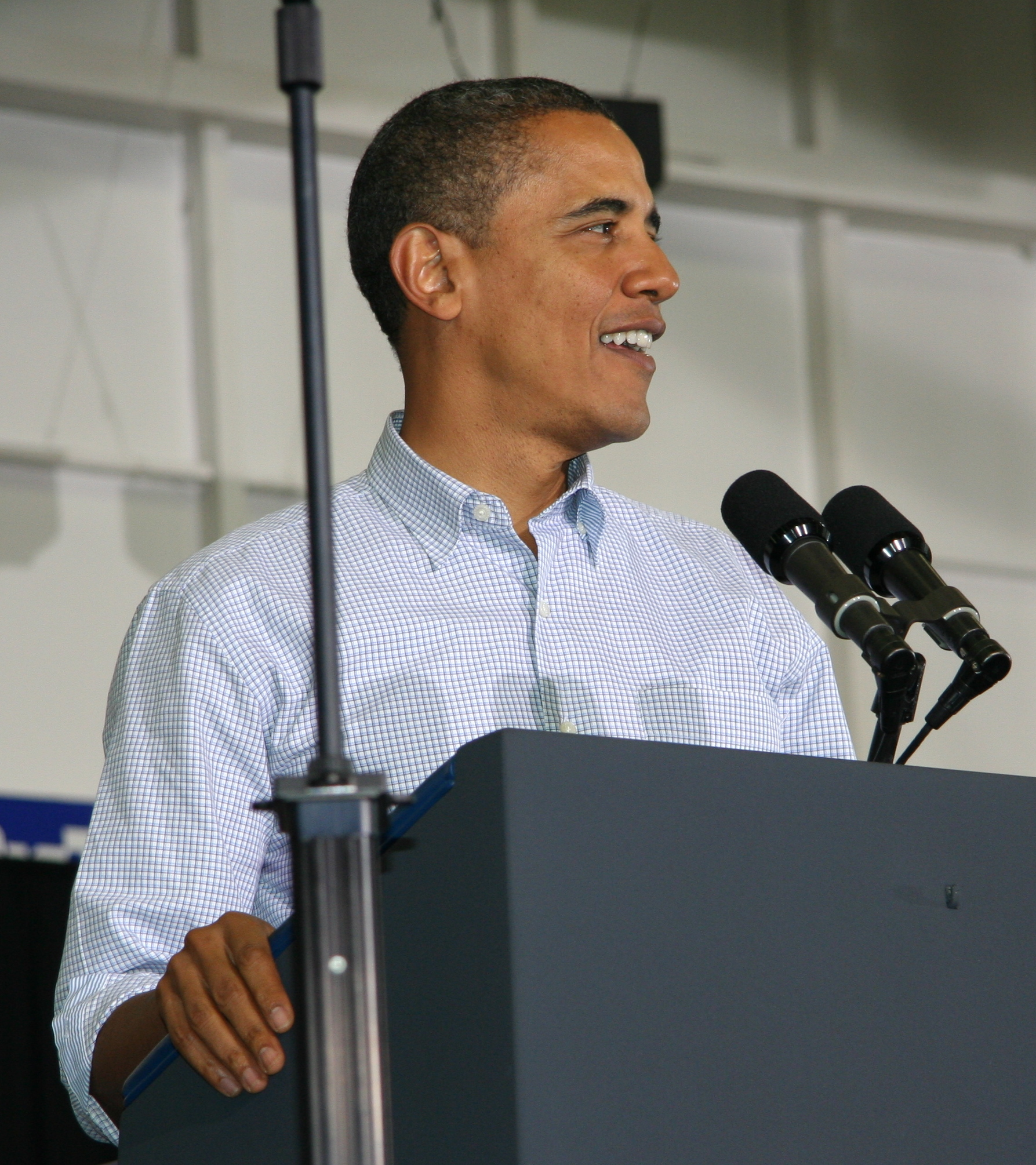
Shure SM57 microphones with A2WS windscreens installed on the lectern of former United States President Barack Obama. The microphone kit (two SM57 microphones, windscreens, microphone stands, and black right-angle XLR cables) is referred to as the VIP/high-profile microphone kit.

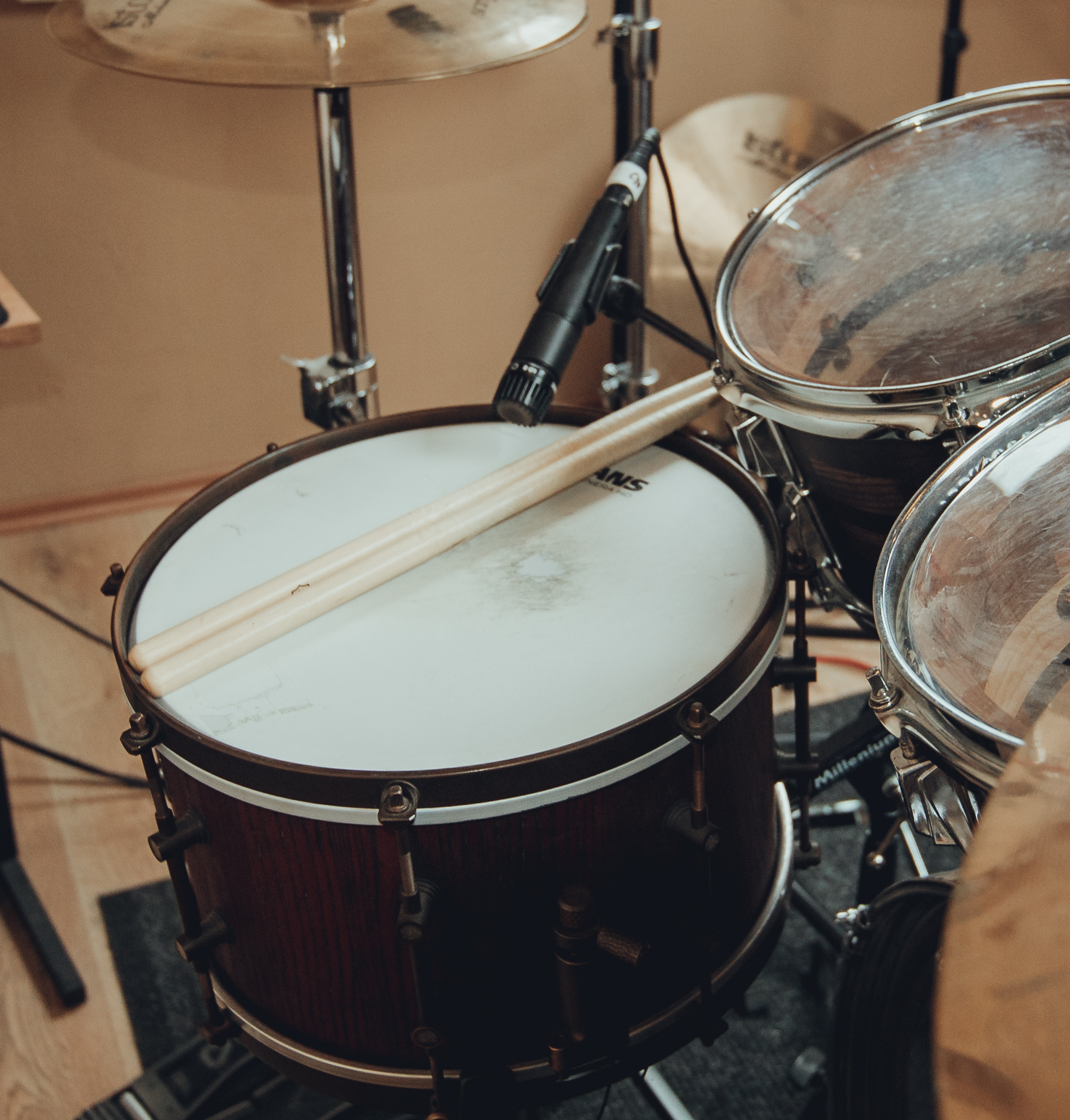
A Shure SM57 used to record a snare drum.

The SM57 is a popular choice of musicians due to its sturdy construction and ability to work well with instruments that produce high sound pressure levels, such as percussion instruments and guitar amplifiers. The School of Audio Engineering (SAE) recommends the SM57 (along with other makes and models) for four roles in a drum kit: kick drum, snare drum, rack toms, and floor tom. The cardioid pickup pattern of the microphone reduces the pickup of unwanted background sound and the generation of acoustic feedback. SM57s have also been a staple when reinforcing the sound from guitar amplifiers.

In a more unconventional fashion, the SM57 has been favored by some as a vocal mic, both live and in the studio. Notable singers known to have recorded vocals with an SM57 include Anthony Kiedis, Brandon Flowers, Madonna, David Bowie, John Lennon, Jack White, Bjork, Peter Gabriel, Paul Rodgers, Tom Waits, Wayne Coyne, Tom PettyAlice Cooper, Erykah Badu, Caleb Followill and Raphael Saadiq. An early model of the mic, the Unidyne 545, was used on Pet Sounds for Brian Wilson's vocal tracks.

Every U.S. president since Lyndon B. Johnson has delivered speeches through an SM57. It became the lectern microphone of the White House Communications Agency in 1965, the year of its introduction, and remains so.

Due to its popularity, the SM57 has been counterfeited frequently by manufacturers in China and Thailand. Shure Distribution UK reports that the SM57, SM58, Beta 57A, and Beta 58A are their microphones that are most commonly counterfeited. In 2006, Shure mounted a campaign against the trading of counterfeit microphones.

== Specifications ==
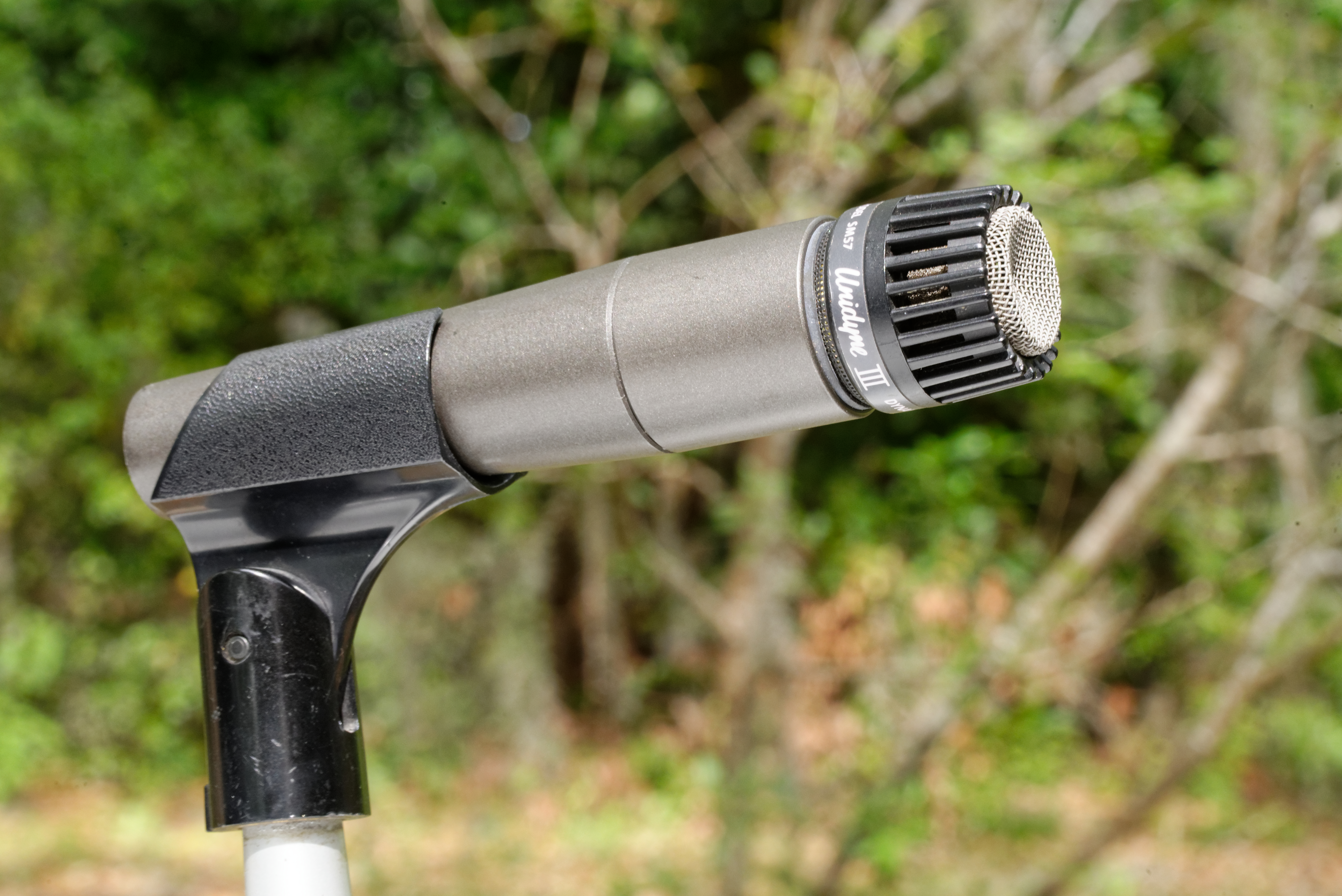
SM57 Unidyne III, c. 1984

Type
Dynamic
Frequency response
40 to 15,000 Hz
Polar pattern
Cardioid
Sensitivity (at 1,000 Hz open circuit voltage)
−56.0 dBV/Pa (at 1,000 Hz)
Impedance
Rated impedance is 150 ohms (300 ohms actual) for connection to microphone inputs rated low impedance
Connector
Three-pin professional audio connector (male XLR type)
Produced
1965–present

== See also ==
- Shure SM58
- Shure MV7
- Shure SM7, a mic that uses a modified version of the Unidyne III capsule and no transformer.
