= Shure Beta 58A =

Dynamic microphone model

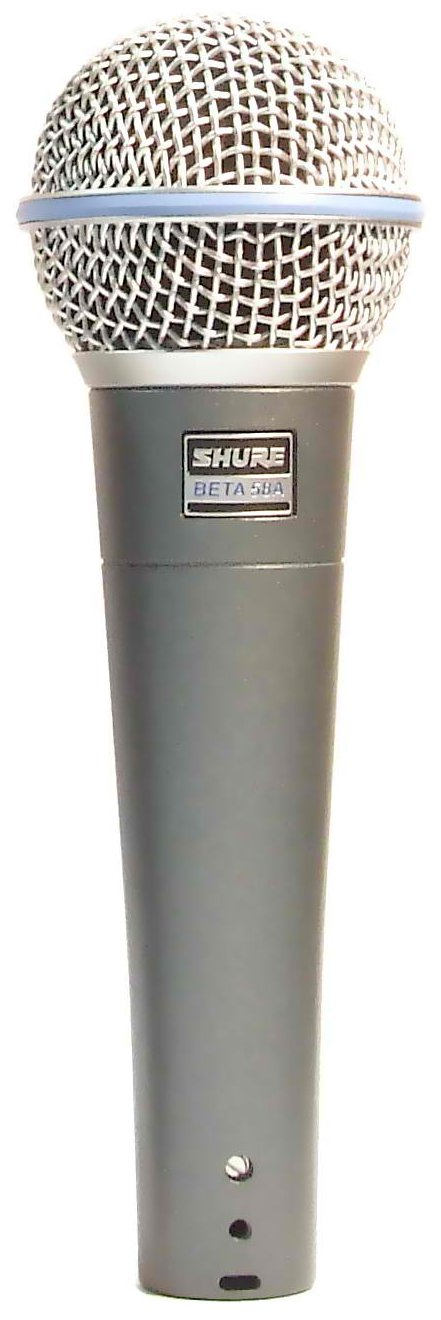
The Shure Beta 58A microphone

The Shure Beta 58A is a rugged dynamic supercardioid microphone developed by Shure Incorporated specifically for live vocal performances. The microphone won a TEC Award in 1996 for outstanding microphone technology.

Shure's Beta series of microphones was introduced in 1989. Originally the Beta 58 was available as the Beta 58C (chrome grill) or the Beta 58M (matte grill). The Beta 58C was eventually discontinued and the Beta 58M became just the Beta 58. The Beta 58 was then discontinued and replaced by the Beta 58A.

== Development ==
In 1996, Shure altered the Beta 58 to create the Beta 58A, with a completely new cartridge design, meant to mimic the old cartridge as far as polar pattern, output level, and frequency response, but with slightly different sound characteristics; the revised design also removed the hum-bucking coil and added an output transformer.

== Comparisons ==
Regarding the difference between the Beta 58 and Beta 58A, the manufacturer's website says, "The Beta 58A has a completely new cartridge in it. While the new cartridge is meant to mimic the old cartridge as far as polar pattern, output level, and frequency response goes, it is a different cartridge and will sound slightly different. Two major differences are that we removed the hum bucking coil on the new model and added an output transformer."

Though the shape and intended applications are similar, the Beta 58A has little in common with the earlier and popular SM58. The Beta series uses a capsule and a transformer different from the SM series.

== Performance ==
The Beta 58A has a frequency response extending from 50 to 16,000 Hz, with frequencies attenuated below 500 Hz to counter the proximity effect. It has two high frequency presence peaks, one at 4 kHz and another at 10 kHz. The Beta 58A also features a supercardioid pick-up pattern for better sound rejection from the sides.

== Notable users ==
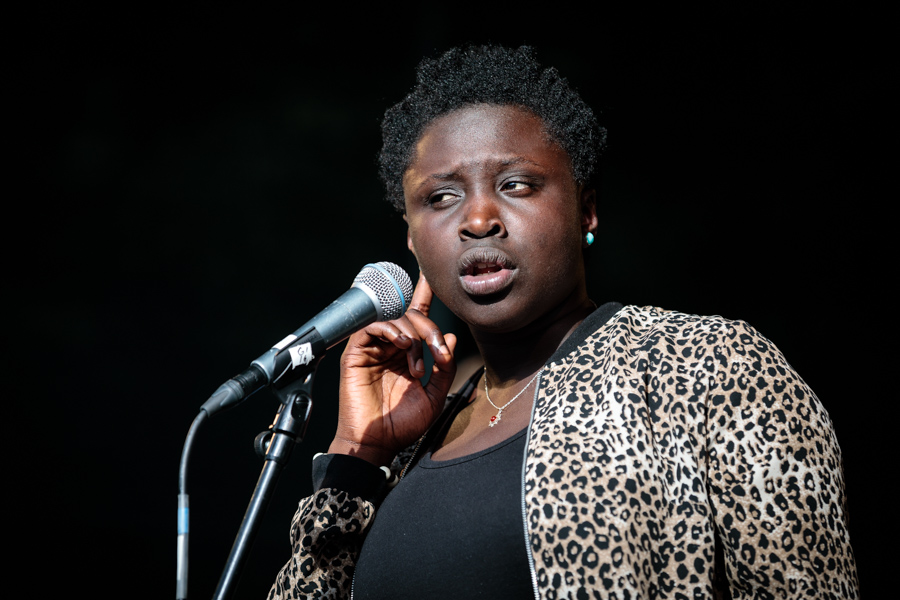
Norwegian singer Rohey Taalah

- Alison Krauss & Union Station
- Axl Rose
- Bono
- Chuck Billy
- David Bowie
- Elton John
- Empire of the Sun
- Kid Kenobi
- Matt & Kim
- Myles Kennedy
- Nine Inch Nails
- Powderfinger
- Richard Patrick
- Sneaky Sound System
- Susan Tedeschi
- The Cat Empire
- The Herd
- The Killers
- The Presets
- The Who
- Tricky

== See also ==
- Shure SM57
- Shure MV7
