= Shure SM58 =

Professional cardioid dynamic microphone

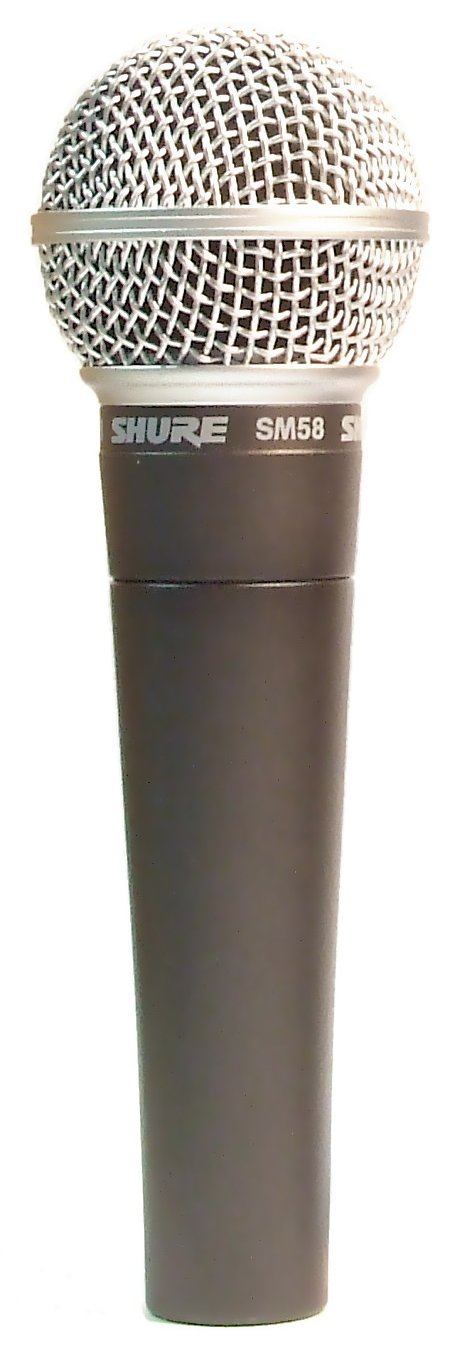
An SM58

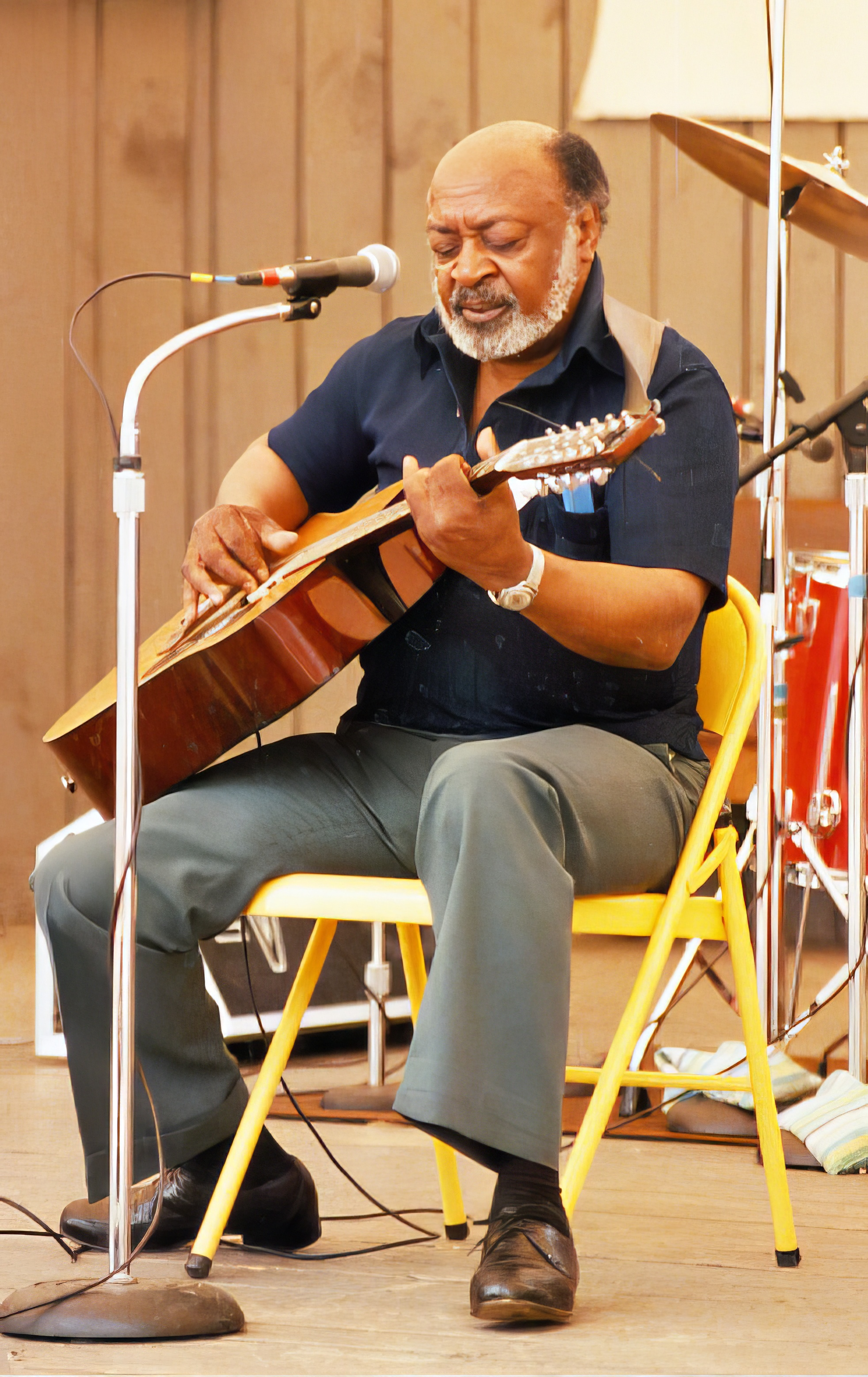
Robert Lockwood Jr using an SM58 in 1982

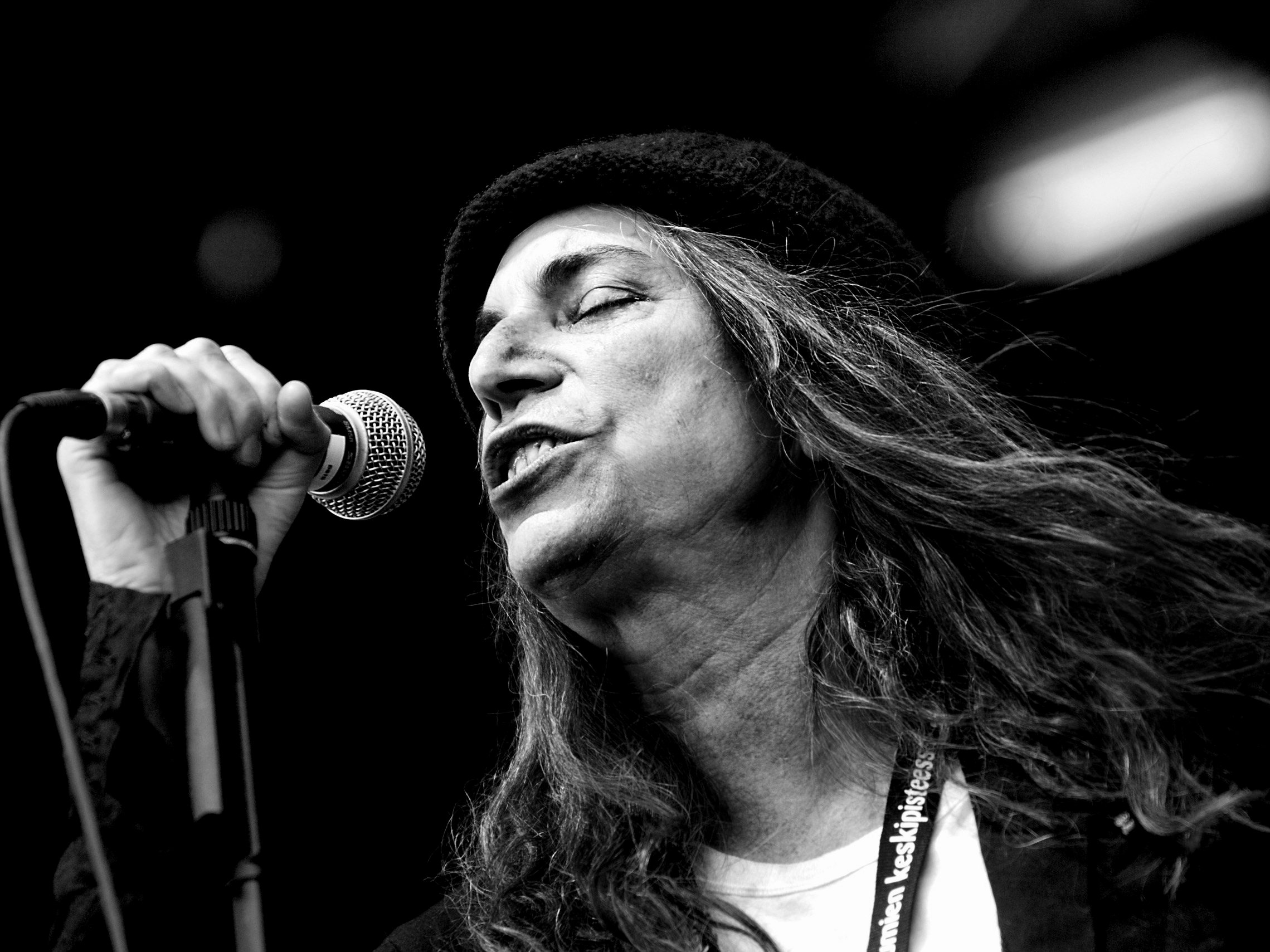
Patti Smith using an SM58 in 2007

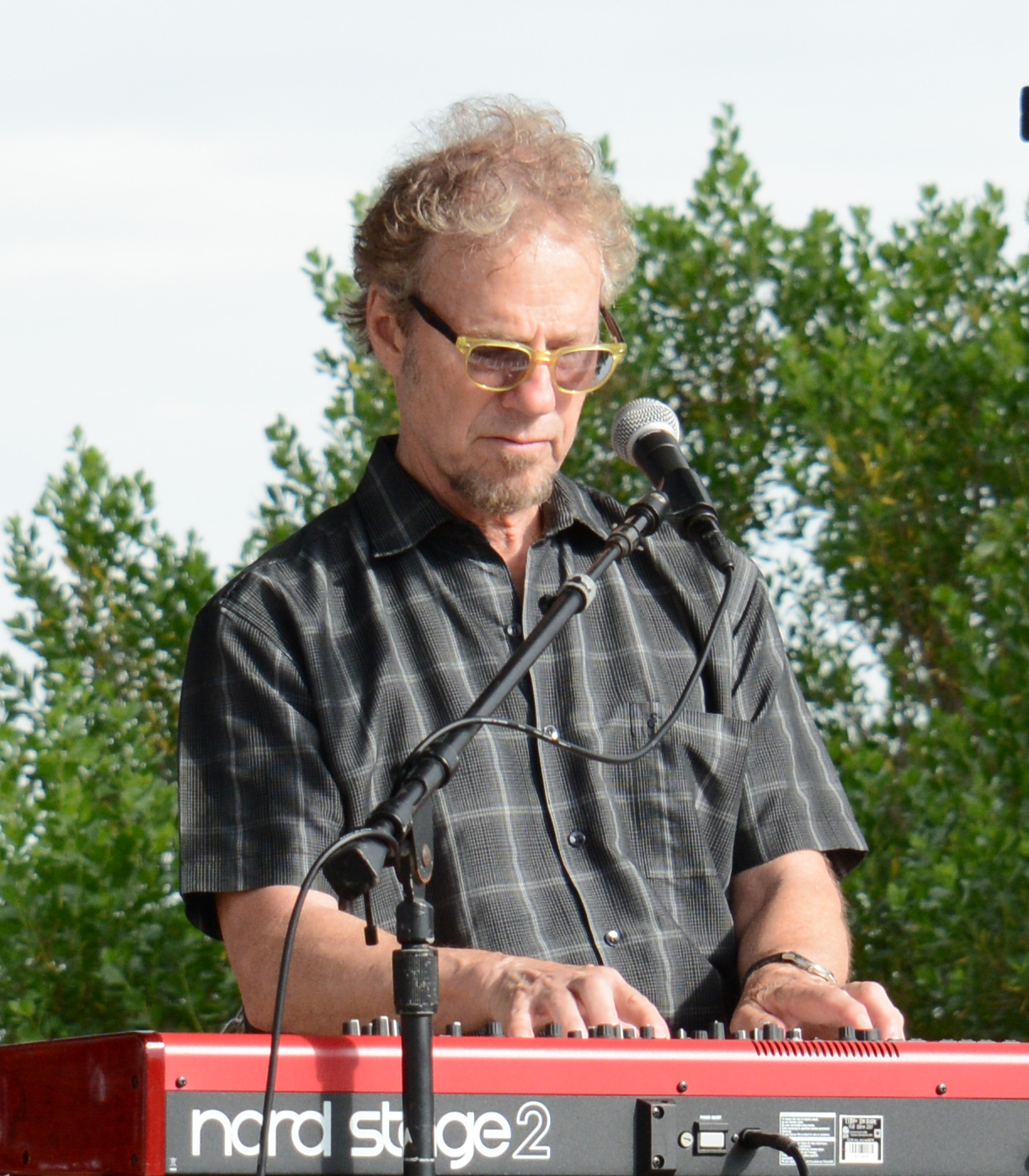
Randall Bramblett using an SM58 in 2015

The Shure SM58 is a professional cardioid dynamic microphone, commonly used in live vocal applications. Produced since 1966 by Shure Incorporated, it has built a reputation among musicians for its durability and sound, and is still the industry standard for live vocal performance microphones. The SM58 is the most popular live vocal microphone in the world. It is a development of the SM57 microphone, which is another industry standard for both live and recorded music. In both cases, SM stands for studio microphone.

== Overview ==
Like all directional microphones, the SM58 is subject to proximity effect, a low-frequency boost when used close to the source. The cardioid response reduces pickup from the side and rear, helping to avoid feedback onstage. There are wired (with and without on/off switch) and wireless versions. The wired version provides balanced audio through a male XLR connector. The SM58 uses an internal shock mount to reduce handling noise.

A distinctive feature of the SM58 is its pneumatic suspension system for the microphone capsule. The capsule, a readily replaceable component, is surrounded by a soft rubber balloon, rather than springs or solid rubber. This gives notably good isolation from handling noise; one reason for its being a popular microphone for stage vocalists. Microphones with this feature are intended primarily for hand-held use, rather than on a stand or for instrument miking.

The SM58 is unswitched, while the otherwise identical SM58S has a sliding on–off switch on the body. Other suffixes refer to any accessories supplied with the microphone: when a cable is provided, the model is actually SM58-CN, while the SM58-LC has no provided cable (LC means Less Cable); the MVX2U and SM58 bundle consists of the SM58-LC and an inline MVX2U XLR-to-USB signal adaptor (capable of providing phantom power for condenser microphones, and offering an in-built headphone jack for monitoring).

The primary difference between the SM58 and the SM57 is the grille. The SM58 is intended for live vocal performances, which tend to put the microphone much closer to plosives. These can stress the diaphragm and distort sound. The rounded grille of the SM58 is lined inside with a thin layer of reticulated foam (open-cell foam) to serve as a pop filter.

== Specifications ==
Type: Dynamic (moving coil)

Frequency response
50 to 15,000 Hz
Polar pattern
Cardioid, rotationally symmetrical about microphone axis, uniform with frequency
Sensitivity (at 1,000 Hz Open Circuit Voltage)
−54.5 dBV/Pa (1.85 mV); 1 Pa = 94 dB SPL
Impedance
Rated impedance is 150 Ω (300 Ω actual) for connection to microphone inputs rated low impedance
Polarity
Positive pressure on diaphragm produces positive voltage on pin 2 with respect to pin 3
Connector
Three-pin male XLR
Net weight
298 grams (10.5 oz)

== Awards ==
- In 2007 and 2008, the SM58 won the MI Pro Retail Survey "Best Live Microphone" award.
- In 2011, Acoustic Guitar magazine honored the SM58 with a Gold Medal in the Player's Choice Awards.

== Counterfeiting ==
The SM58 and SM57 have been extensively counterfeited. Most of these counterfeit microphones are at least functional, but have poorer performance and do not have the pneumatic suspension. There are many other subtle details which can reveal most of these fakes.

== See also ==
- Shure SM57
- Shure Beta 58A
- Shure MV7
