= Shure MV7 =

Microphone for podcasting

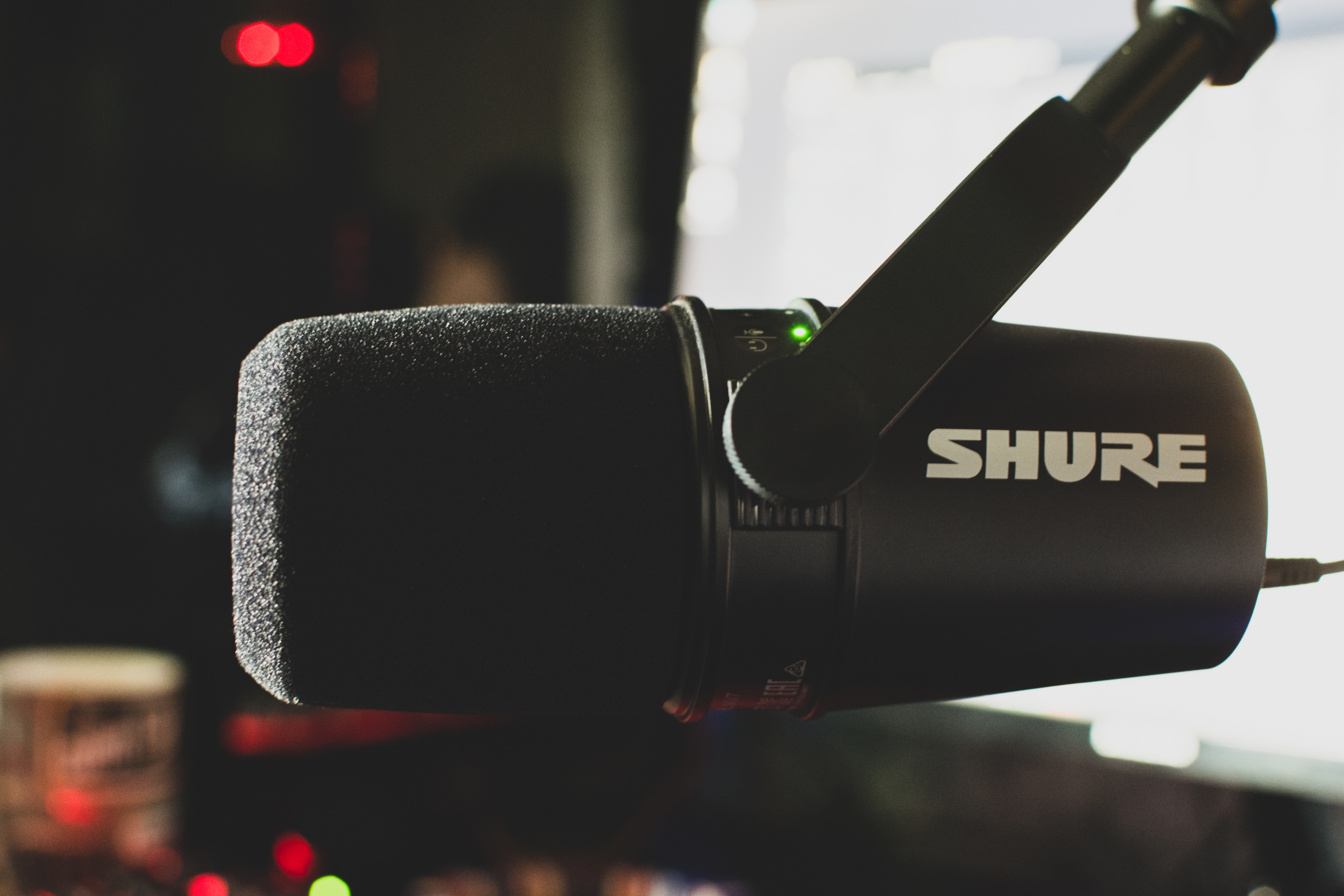
Shure MV7 podcasting microphone

The Shure MV7 is a cardioid dynamic microphone used for podcasting and home studio applications. The MV7 was developed in 2020 by Shure as a digital audio reworking of the classic SM7B professional broadcasting microphone. The MV7 was rated the best podcasting microphone by Rolling Stone in their 2021 Audio Awards.

Designed to be mounted on a stand or boom arm, the MV7 can send its audio signal through a USB cable to a Macintosh or Windows computer, or to Android or iOS devices. To augment the microphone's capabilities, Shure supplies Motiv, a free-to-use proprietary software application intended to simplify the recording or streaming process for each operating system. The MV7 is certified with the Apple MFi Program and is compatible with the VoIP application TeamSpeak, to allow chat channel communication with others online.

The microphone can also be connected to professional audio equipment using the XLR connector on the back, with both the XLR and the USB connectors working at the same time. A third minijack port on the back allows headphones to be connected so that the person who is speaking can hear the results clearly.

The MV7 has been reviewed positively by Engadget, PCMag, Audio Technology magazine,Radio World, Sound on Sound and Pro Sound News.

== Specifications ==
Type
Dynamic (moving coil)
Frequency response
20 to 20,000 Hz
Polar pattern
Cardioid
Sensitivity (at 1,000 Hz Open Circuit Voltage)
−55 dBV/Pa (1.78 mV)
Maximum SPL
132 dB
Impedance
314 ohms
Polarity
Positive pressure on diaphragm produces positive voltage on pin 2 relative to pin 3
Connectors
Three-pin male XLR, 3.5 mm headphone, Micro-B USB
Switches
Bass-rolloff (high-pass filter) and mid-range boost
Net weight
550 grams (19 oz)

== See also ==
- Shure SM57
- Shure SM58
- Shure Beta 58A
