= Shure =

American audio products corporation

Shure Inc.
- Type: Private
- Industry: Consumer and professional audio electronics
- Founded: April 25, 1925; 101 years ago (as The Shure Radio Company)
- Founder: Sidney N. Shure
- Headquarters: Niles, Illinois, U.S.
- Area served: Worldwide
- Key people: Christine Schyvinck (CEO)
- Products: Microphones, wireless microphone systems, headphones and earphones, mixers, and conferencing systems
- Website: www.shure.com

Shure Inc. is an American corporation that specializes in developing and manufacturing audio equipment technology. It was founded by Sidney N. Shure in Chicago, Illinois, in 1925 as a supplier of radio parts kits. The company became a manufacturer of consumer and professional audio-electronics including microphones, wireless microphone systems, discussion systems, mixers, and digital signal processing. The company also manufactures listening products, including headphones, high-end earphones, and personal monitor systems.

== History ==
Classic Shure "Circle S" logo from the 1930s, which graphically depicts an electronic circuit

Shure was founded by Sidney N. Shure in 1925 as "The Shure Radio Company", selling radio parts kits several years after completely manufactured radios became commercially available. The company's office was located at 19 South Wells Street in downtown Chicago, Illinois. The following year, Shure published its first direct mail catalog, which was one of only six radio parts catalogs in the United States at the time. By 1928, the company had grown to over 75 employees, and Sidney's brother, Samuel J. Shure, joined the company, which was renamed Shure Brothers Company. The company moved into new offices at 335 West Madison Street in Chicago. In 1929, with the advent of the Great Depression and the increased availability of factory-built radios, Shure Brothers Company was forced to greatly reduce their staff and became the exclusive U.S. distributor of a small microphone manufacturer. In 1930, Samuel J. Shure left the company.

In 1931, Shure and engineer Ralph Glover began development of the first Shure microphone, and the following year, the Model 33N Two-Button Carbon Microphone was introduced, making Shure one of only four U.S. microphone manufacturers. Shure's first condenser microphone, crystal microphone, and microphone suspension support system (for which they received their first patent) were all introduced that same decade. In 1939, Shure introduced the Model 55 Unidyne Microphone, which went on to become one of the world's most recognized microphones.

In 1941, Shure was contracted by the United States armed forces to supply microphones during World War II, and by the following year, the T-17B was the microphone most widely used by the U.S. Army and Navy. Shure also manufactured throat, headset, and oxygen mask microphones, and adopted the United States Military Standard for all Shure microphones.

By the mid-1940s, Shure was also manufacturing and supplying phonograph cartridges to major phonograph manufacturers including Philco, RCA, Emerson, Magnavox, Admiral, and Motorola, and was the largest producer of phonograph cartridges in the U.S. at that time. Among Shure's innovations in phonograph cartridge design was Ralph Glover and Ben Bauer's "needle-tilt" principle for minimizing record wear while improving sound reproduction, and Jim Kogen's engineering concept of "trackability". Shure produced the first phonograph cartridge capable of playing both long-playing and 78 rpm records, the first cartridge with tracking force of only one gram, and the first cartridge meeting the requirements of stereo recording. At the peak of Shure's phonograph cartridge production, the company was producing approximately 28,000 cartridges per day, with 25,000 of those coming from a Shure phonograph cartridge plant in Phoenix, Arizona. After the introduction of compact discs in the 1980s reduced the demand for phonograph cartridges, Shure closed the Phoenix facility but continued manufacturing phonograph cartridges in Mexico. In 2018, Shure announced that they would exit the phonograph cartridge market.

Shure also developed and produced products for medical applications. In 1937, their 66A piezoelectric stethophone was designed to accurately reproduce chest sounds, and in the early 1960s, the SP-5, SP-5S and SP-6 stethoscope pickups were produced. Shure also produced hearing aid cartridges used in hearing aid products from manufacturers like Maico, Telex, Dictograph, Otarian, Vocalite, and Trimm.

In 1956, Shure moved its corporate headquarters to Hartrey Avenue in Evanston, Illinois, where it remained for 47 years. Beginning in 1956, Shure manufactured magnetic tape recording heads and two years later, the company announced it was ready to mass-produce 4-ch recording heads. By 1964, however, Shure announced it would no longer produce tape recording heads due to increased competition.

In 1953, Shure introduced their first wireless microphone system for performers, and in 1959, they introduced the Unidyne III capsule based 545 Microphone, which was the predecessor to the SM57, which would be introduced, along with the SM58, six years later. Shure also produced portable equipment for broadcast field recording such as the M67, M267, FP31, FP32, FP42 portable mixers.

In 1990, Shure entered the wireless microphone market with the L-Series.

In 1981, James Kogen, executive vice president, operations, was promoted to president and general manager of Shure. In 1995, Sidney N. Shure died at the age of 93, and Rose L. Shure was elected chairman of the board of directors. In 1996, James Kogen retired; Santo (Sandy) LaMantia, Vice President of Engineering, was named president and CEO. Shure Brothers Incorporated was officially renamed Shure Incorporated in 1999. Rose Shure died in 2016 at the age of 95

In 2001, Shure acquired the Popper Stopper brand of studio pop filters from Middle Atlantic Products Inc. In 2002, Shure adopted hearing conservation as the company's corporate cause, and established the Shure Bid for Hearing program. In 2003, Shure moved to new headquarters in Niles, Illinois, in a building designed by architect Helmut Jahn that was originally the headquarters of HA•LO Industries. The 65,000-square-foot (6,000 m^{2}) Technology Annex designed by Krueck and Sexton Architects, opened in 2005, houses Shure's Performance Listening Center. In 2008, Shure celebrated the opening of The S.N. Shure Theater and Interactive Display at their corporate headquarters. In 2016, Sandy LaMantia announced his retirement and Christine Schyvinck, vice president of global operations, marketing, and sales and chief operating officer, was promoted to president and CEO.

In October 2020, Shure acquired Midas Technology, Inc., also known as Stem Audio, which specializes in table, ceiling and wall microphones as well as loudspeakers, control interfaces and hubs.

In September 2023, it was announced Shure had acquired the Helsinki-headquartered software developer for theater, film, TV, broadcast, and content streaming applications, Ab Wavemark Oy.

=== International offices ===
- 1991: Shure Europe GmbH opened in Heilbronn, Germany, to provide sales, service and support to Shure distribution centers in 34 European countries.
- 1999: Shure Asia Limited is opened in Hong Kong to serve Distribution Centers and distributors throughout Asia and the Pacific Rim.
- 2002: Shure Distribution GmbH established as a subsidiary of Shure Europe GmbH, to handle direct sales with Shure dealers in Germany.
- 2003: HW International, Shure's United Kingdom Distribution Center, acquired and renamed Shure Distribution UK.
- 2005: Sales and marketing office opened in Shanghai, China.
- 2006: Sales and marketing office opened in Tokyo, Japan.
- 2010: New subsidiary formed in the Netherlands
- 2011: Office for product development in Copenhagen, Denmark.
- 2014: Sales and marketing office for Middle East & Africa opened in Dubai, U.A.E.
- 2018: Shure Distribution GmbH Begins Direct Distribution of System and Consumer Retail Products in Austria
- 2018: Shure Distribution Switzerland GmbH starts direct operations

=== Production facility expansion ===
- 1982: Manufacturing facility opened in Wheeling, Illinois
- 1983: Phonograph cartridge manufacturing facility opened in Agua Prieta, Mexico
- 1984: Wired microphone manufacturing facility opened in Ciudad Juárez, Mexico
- 1989: Ciudad Juárez facility expanded
- 1994: Agua Prieta facility expanded in 1994
- 2005: Manufacturing facility opened in Suzhou, China

== Products ==
=== Wired microphones ===
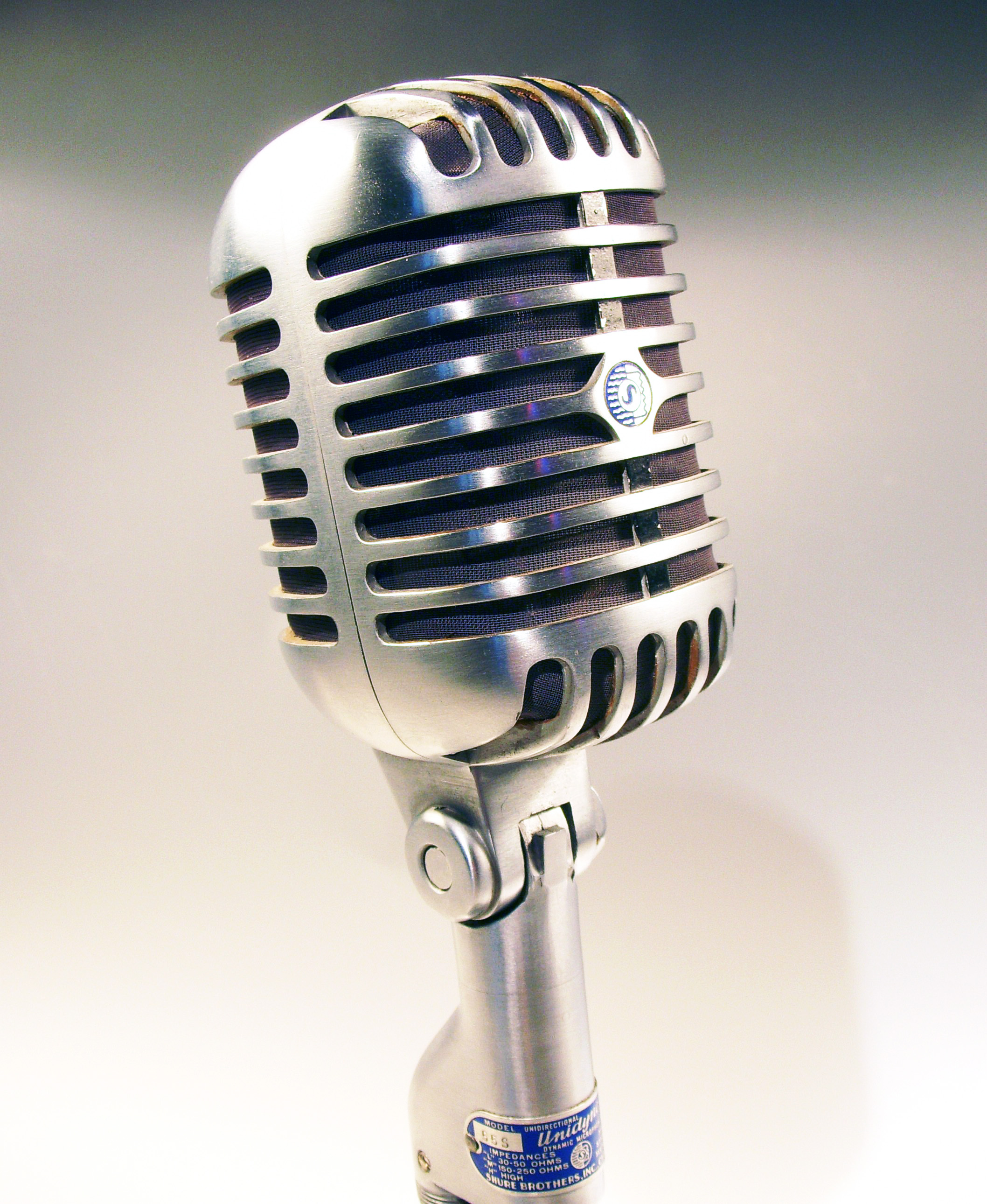
Shure 55S

Shure first began manufacturing their own products in 1932 with the introduction of the 33N two-button carbon microphone. The Model 40D, Shure's first condenser microphone, was introduced the next year, and the first of a line of crystal microphone, the Model 70, was introduced in 1935. With the introduction of the 55 Unidyne microphone in 1939, the company's offerings included carbon, condenser, crystal, and dynamic microphones. Wired and wireless microphones together represent the largest category of Shure's overall business. Shure currently produces numerous series of microphones for various applications, including the SM, Beta, KSM, and PG series, as well as specialty consumer microphones, Microflex, and Easyflex (conferencing systems for commercially installed applications).

One of Shure's most visually iconic microphone series is the Unidyne series, seen in use by heads of state and popular recording artists and performers from the 1940s through the end of the twentieth century, including President John F. Kennedy, Ella Fitzgerald, and Frank Sinatra. The Model 55 Unidyne is pictured with Harry S. Truman in the photograph where he is holding the Chicago Tribune newspaper with the erroneous front-page headline "Dewey Defeats Truman". It is also pictured in front of Fidel Castro on the cover of the January 19, 1959, issue of Life magazine and in front of Martin Luther King Jr. as he delivered his "I Have a Dream" speech during the August 1963 March on Washington for Jobs and Freedom. The original Shure 55 Unidyne microphone was designed by engineer Ben Bauer and first produced in 1939. Shure designed the 55 Unidyne as a rugged public address microphone with good audio performance. It was notable for its single-element, unidirectional design, which was smaller, less susceptible to feedback, and less sensitive to ambient noise than other microphones of the time. Several variants of the original Unidyne have been produced, most notably the 55S or "Baby Unidyne". The 55S is sometimes referred to as the "Elvis mic" due to its frequent use by Elvis Presley, and is the microphone depicted with Elvis on the commemorative first-class Elvis stamp issued by the U.S. Postal Service in 1993. In 2008, the Unidyne Model 55 microphone was inducted into the TECnology Hall of Fame, and the following year, Shure released the 55SH Series II. A supercardioid version, the Super 55 Deluxe Vocal Microphone, was introduced in 2009, featuring high gain before feedback and excellent off-axis rejection and further extending Unidyne's 70-plus year legacy. The 55 Series microphones were given the "IEEE Milestone" award in 2014.

With the U.S. Army's approval of the Shure T-17 microphone for use during World War II, Shure began producing what would be several specialized microphones for U.S. military use during that war. Shure's adoption of the Military Standard Specification, and product redesigns intended to conserve raw materials essential to the war effort, positioned the company to fulfill the military's needs for specialized microphones. The T-17 Battle Announce Microphone was the most widely used microphone in the U.S. Army and Air Force during World War II, and featured a plastic case that conserved aluminum and lighter and more reliable in a wide range of temperatures and climates. A waterproof version was used on nearly all U.S. Navy ships. Shure also designed the T-30 Throat Microphone for flight crews. A cloth strap held the T-30 against the throat, capturing the user's voice box vibrations directly and avoiding the background noise of the airplane. Shure also manufactured specialized headsets and the MC-1 oxygen mask microphone. In yet another example of the widespread use of Shure microphones by the U.S. military, U.S. lookout Private Lockhard used a Shure 700A microphone to announce his sighting of Japanese planes approaching Pearl Harbor on the morning of December 7, 1941.

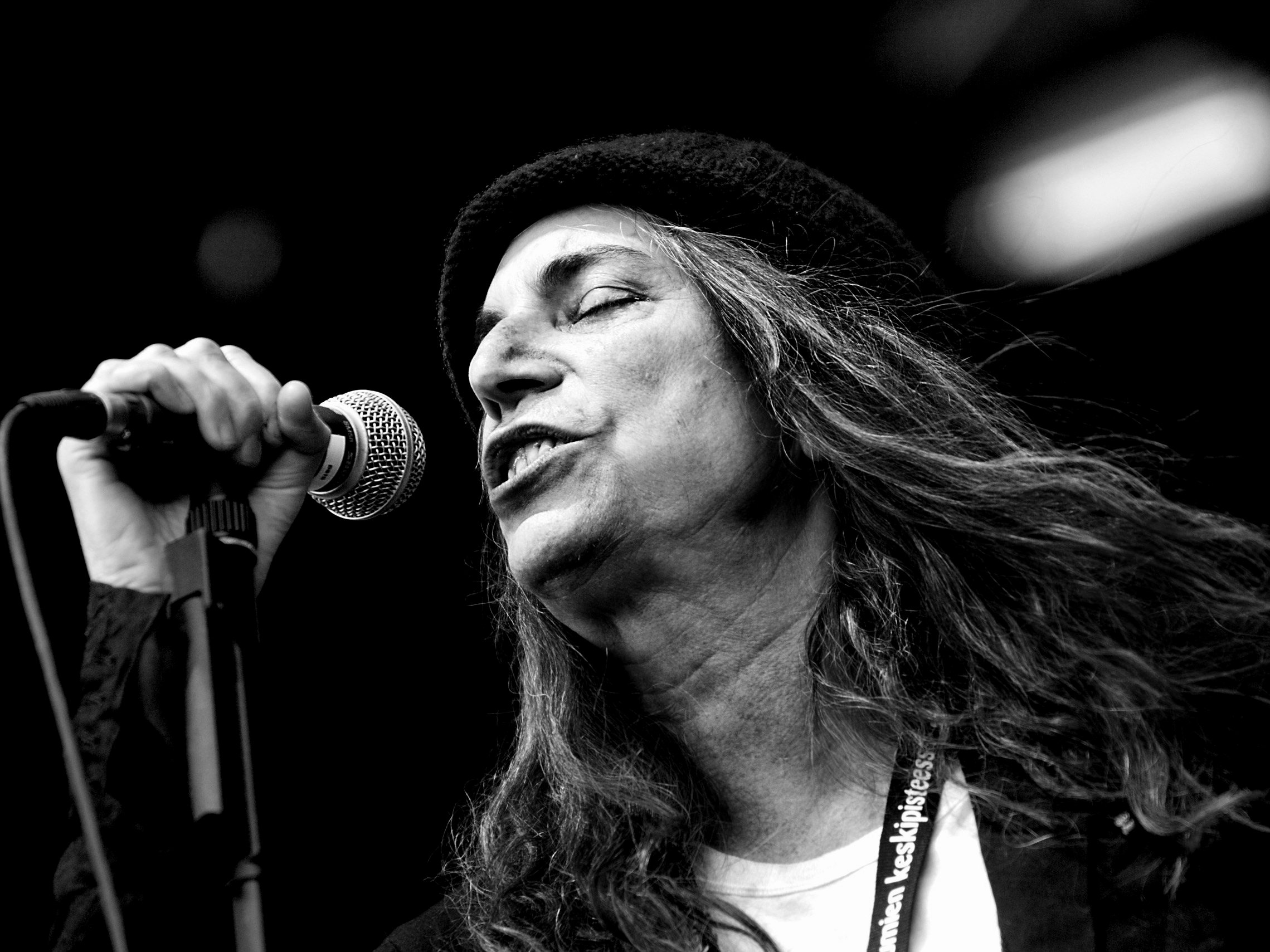
Patti Smith singing into a Shure SM58 microphone

The Shure SM series of microphones began with the introduction of the SM57 in 1965 and the SM58 in 1966. The SM (Studio Microphone) series microphones were originally developed with a non-reflective finish and no on-off switch for the TV studio market. The SM57 is well known for its durability and the versatile sound characteristics, much attributable to the Ernie Seeler-designed Unidyne III capsule. Produced since 1965 and still in production today, it has been widely used in many applications, including micing vocals, drums, and guitar amplifiers both in live sound and recording applications, including being used by every United States President from Lyndon Baines Johnson on. The SM57 was inducted into the TECnology Hall Of Fame in 2004. Together, the Shure SM57 and SM58 have been the two bestselling microphones in the world since the late 1960s. Their feature set is nearly identical, with the main difference between the two being their different grilles. Shure later expanded the SM series, which now include such models as the now hard to find SM53 & SM54 (which were low proximity effect microphones), SM45, SM48, SM56, SM57, SM58, SM85, SM86, SM87A, SM94, and the SM81 which is a longtime recording studio standard.

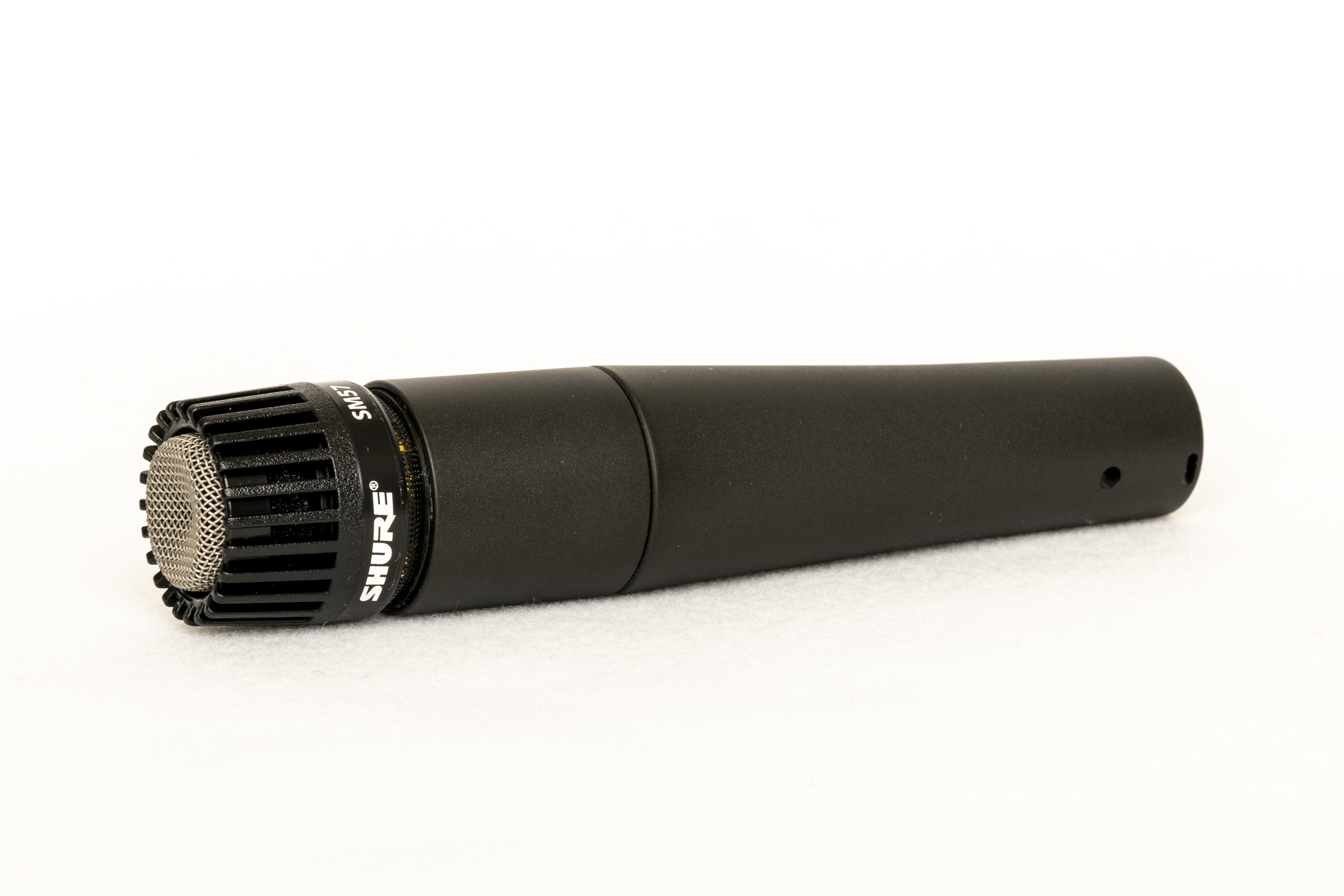
Shure SM57

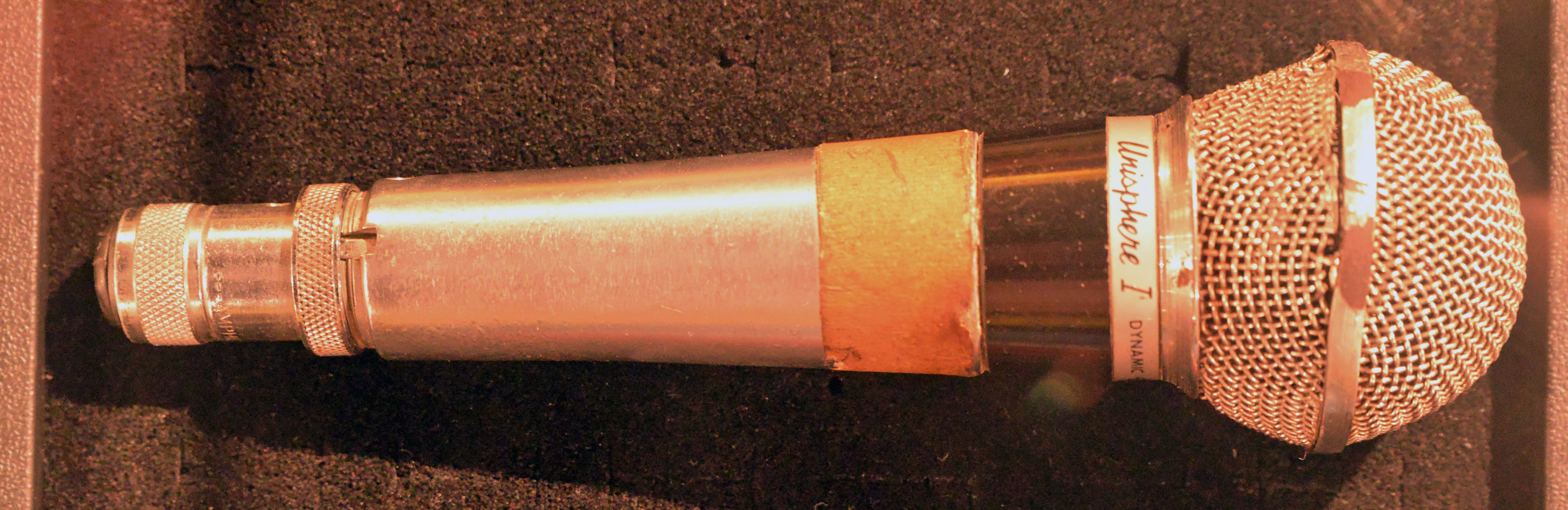
Shure Unisphere 565 used at the Woodstock Music and Art Fair

Shure introduced Beta Series microphones in 1989. These feature a supercardioid designs based on SM series microphones, but with neodymium magnet structures for higher output. The series also included two new microphones specifically for drums, the Beta 56 drum microphone and the Beta 52 kick drum microphone, later updated to the Beta 52A. The Beta 58A microphone was awarded a TEC award in 1996, and several other Beta series microphones have been nominated for TEC awards over the years.

Shure's first headset microphone for stage use was created in 1991. One of the earliest uses of a Shure headset mic onstage was for the television special Medusa: Dare to be Truthful. Among the headset microphones Shure has manufactured over the years are the WH20, WH30, WCM16 (introduced in 1993), Beta53 and Beta54. The newest of Shure's headset microphones, the MX153, part of the Microflex series, was introduced in 2012.

In 1999, Shure introduced the first mic in their KSM Series of premium recording microphones, the KSM32. KSM series microphones feature Class A discrete transformer-less preamplifiers. Ten years later in 2009, Shure acquired Crowley and Tripp Ribbon Microphones from Soundwave Research Laboratories of Ashland, Massachusetts, along with the company's proprietary "Roswellite" ribbon material, and added both ribbon microphones, now rebranded the KSM353 and KSM313, to the KSM series.

Shure brought out the SM5 microphone in 1966, intended for broadcasting applications. In 1973, the SM5 was updated and reduced in size to become the SM7, which was widely adopted by television and radio announcers, but occasionally used in recording studios to pick up vocals, horns, guitars or bass drums. Both the SM5 and SM7 were built on the SM57-type Unidyne III element as the core transducer, tailored for lower frequency response. Engineer-producer Bruce Swedien used the SM7 to record Michael Jackson's vocals for Thriller. In 1999 the SM7A model appeared with beefed-up shielding against electromagnetic interference (for instance from television CRTs), and in 2001 the SM7B model added a larger windscreen. In 2001–2003, the SM7 was used to record heavy metal vocalist James Hetfield for the Metallica album St. Anger, as seen in the documentary Metallica: Some Kind of Monster. The SM7B was radically redesigned in 2020, reduced in size and provided with active digital audio circuitry to become the MV7, with both XLR and USB connections. The MV7 swiftly picked up a large share of the podcasting market, and was named the best podcast microphone by Rolling Stone magazine in 2021.

=== Phonograph cartridges ===
Shure began supplying replacement crystal pickups to various manufacturers in 1933 and by the mid-1940s Shure was the largest supplier of phonograph cartridges in America, supplying record manufacturers like Philco, RCA, Emerson, Magnavox, Admiral, and Motorola. At the peak of Shure's production the company was producing more than 28,000 cartridges per day, with 25,000 produced at Shure's Phoenix plant. While Shure continues to manufacture phono cartridges, the Phoenix facility was closed in the late 1980s due to declining demand.

Shure engineers introduced several key phono cartridge design concepts. Chief engineer Ralph Glover discussed the pickup design relationship to record wear in a 1937 article in Electronics magazine entitled "A Record-Saving Pickup". Glover developed the "needle-tilt" principle with the assistance of fellow Shure engineer Ben Bauer, and considerations of needle angle, record wear, and fidelity were an integral part of Shure's cartridge designs. In 1966, chief engineer Jim Kogen published a research paper entitled "TRACKability" in Audio magazine, defining the concept as the ability of a cartridge to maintain contact with a record groove through any modulation.

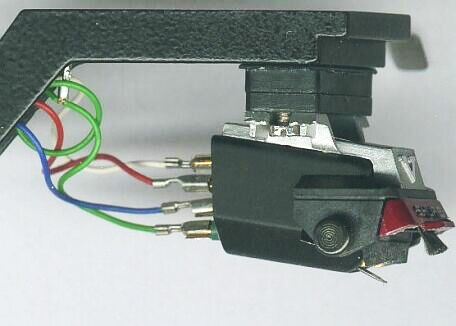
Shure V-15VxMR

Shure is credited with several industry firsts. In 1948, the company introduced the 900MG, the first phonograph cartridge capable of playing both long-playing and 78 rpm records, and in 1954, Shure's M12 Dynetic Phono Reproducer tonearm and cartridge set established an industry standard with a tracking force of only one gram. The M1 Studio Dynetic Cartridge introduced the principle of a moving magnet within a stationary coil, an engineering concept that dominated cartridge design for nearly 25 years due to its higher output, lower noise, and greater headroom. The Shure M3D, introduced in 1958, was the first ever stereo moving magnet cartridge, with 20 dB of stereo separation at 20 kHz.

Shure has also designed and manufactured cartridges specifically for disc jockeys. Their M35X and Whitelabel cartridges are designed for nightclubs. The M44-7, however, is designed for scratching, which involves playing a vinyl record forward and backward rhythmically. The M44-7 cartridge is renowned for its tracking and skip resistance, which has made it a popular choice of turntablists such as The Invisibl Skratch Piklz.

Shure's flagship V15 phonograph cartridge series, with the model name referring to their 15-degree tracking angle, was established for decades as the premier cartridge for low tracking force and high tracking ability. The V-15 series also included several industry firsts: the original V-15 model (introduced in 1964) was the first to feature "trackability", and utilized a symmetrical, bi-radial elliptical stylus. The V-15 Type II (introduced in 1966) was the first computer-designed phono cartridge and the first to feature a flip-action built-in stylus guard. The V-15 Type IV (introduced in 1978) was the first to feature the dynamic stabilizer, which discharged static electricity from the groove and stabilized the cartridge for playback of warped records. The V-15 Type V marked the introduction of a proprietary "ultra-thin wall beryllium" stylus shank with a stiffness-to-mass ratio several times that of other cartridges on the market. In 1998, Sony Music Entertainment selected the Shure V15VxMR to transcribe 80 years of Columbia Records and Sony Music masters and recordings. In 2008, the British Gramophone magazine awarded the V-15 an "Audio Choice" designation for outstanding performance and value. Due to the scarcity of the raw materials required to manufacture V-15 cartridges, Shure discontinued the series in 2004, and in June 2009, the last remaining V-15 stock was purchased by the Library of Congress. On May 1, 2018, Shure publicly announced that they would be ceasing production of all phono products, effective Summer 2018.

=== Sound reinforcement systems ===
Shure introduced the Vocal Master sound reinforcement system, touted as "the first portable total sound system", at the 1968 winter NAMM Show. The Vocal Master system consisted of a combination of control consoles, speakers, amplifiers, mixers, and microphones. Multiple components and systems could be combined to expand the Vocal Master system to larger sound reinforcement applications. The Vocal Master was at one time the official on-tour sound system for performing acts such as the 5th Dimension and the Carpenters among others. Vocal Master was also utilized for installed sound applications in educational institutions and churches, as well as at the Rockefeller Center's Rainbow Room where it was used for performances by such artists as Benny Goodman and Duke Ellington, and at the London Palladium.

=== Mixers and DSP ===
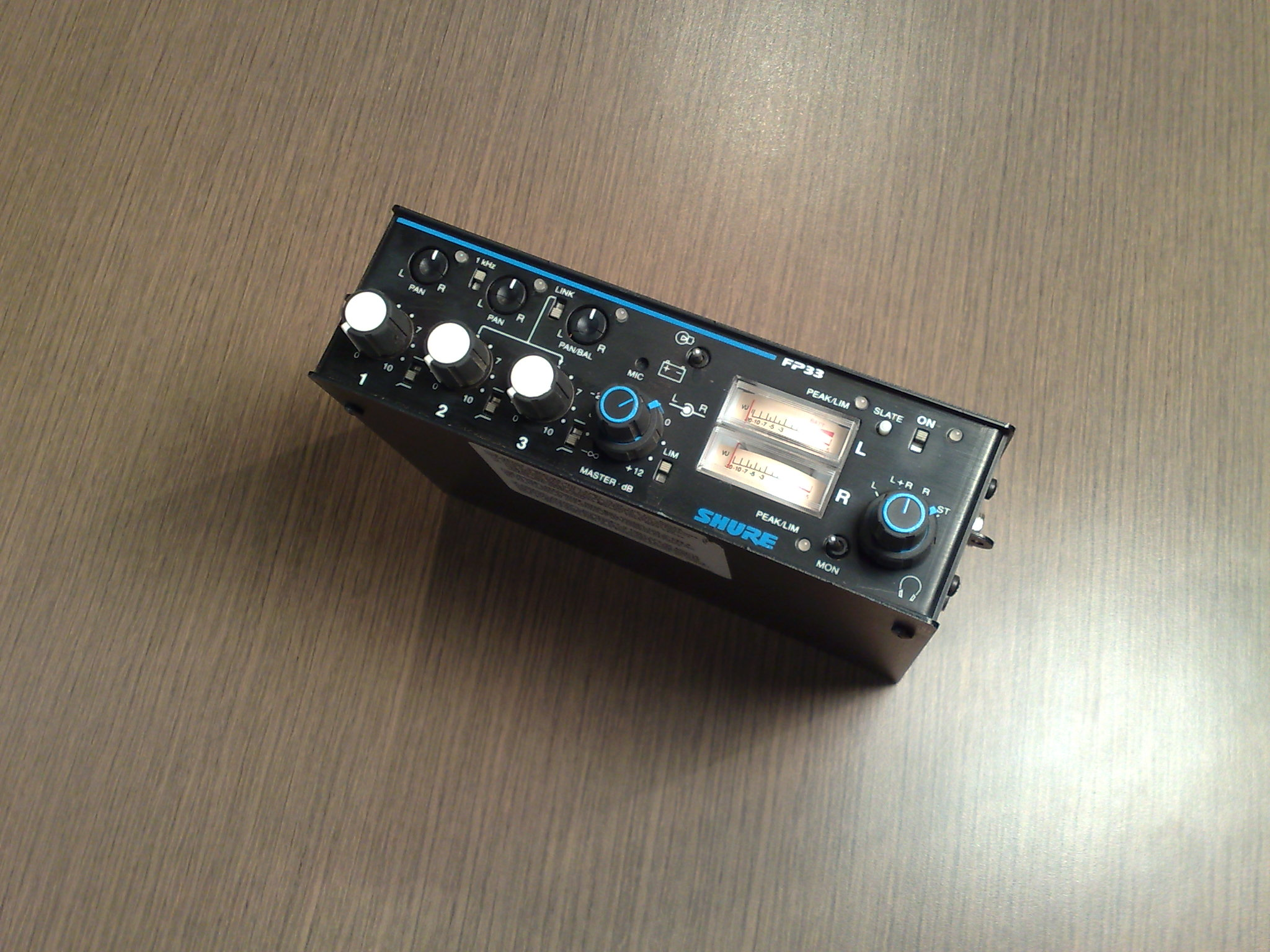
Shure FP33 Field Mixer

In 1966, Shure introduced the M68, a portable mixer capable of being battery powered along with available accessories like a carry case and battery power supply specifically designed to address the needs of broadcast journalists and field recording personnel. The following year, the Shure M67 mixer added an illuminated VU meter and a line level output transformer for connecting the mixer to a telephone line. In August 1969, Eddie Kramer recorded the 4-day Woodstock Festival using three Shure M67 mixers. Shure's portable mixer line later included other models such as the M267 and 268.

Shure introduced the FP31 mixer in 1983. The FP31 was smaller and lighter than similar products of the time—small enough to hold in the palm of the hand and weighing just 2.2 pounds. This positioned it to complement the one-piece Sony Betacam video camera, which had been widely adopted by remote video broadcast crews. The FP31 could operate up to eight hours on two standard 9-volt batteries, and included two separate microphone/line outputs for two-camera video shoots. Its master section featured an adjustable threshold limiter to prevent overload distortion, and there was a separate microphone/line switch with low-cut filter on each channel. By 1984, just a year after its introduction, the FP31 was being used by ABC, CBS, NBC, Turner Broadcasting System, and was later succeeded by the Shure FP33.

In addition, Shure introduced other portable products useful to broadcast remote and field recording, such as FP11 Microphone-To-Line Level amplifier, the FP12 Headphone Bridging amplifier, and the FP22 Headphone amplifier.

In 1991, Shure introduced the FP410 automatic mixer, featuring Shure's patented IntelliMix circuitry, which automatically activates special double-element microphones based on the direction of a talker's signal. That same year, the FP410 was recognized with the Technical Achievement Award from the International Television Association for "significantly advancing the state of the art in the field of non-network television". Shure later introduced the SCM810, an 8-in, 1-out automatic microphone mixer that also featured Shure IntelliMix circuitry.

Shure also introduced digital signal processing products for this market, beginning with the DFR11EQ digital feedback reducer (introduced in 1996) and the DFR22 2-in, 2-out feedback reduction audio processor.

=== Conferencing systems ===
Shure introduced the Automatic Microphone System (AMS) in 1983, one of the first automatic, high-quality mixer system using directional gating for installations utilizing multiple microphones. In 1987, Shure SCM810 Automatic Mixer installations begin at the United States Capitol, and by 1997, the US Capitol was one of the largest Shure automatic mixer installations in the world. In 2008, Shure introduced the Microflex microphone line specifically designed for conference room applications.

In 2013 Shure launched the Microflex Wireless (MXW) System, its first dedicated wireless microphone solution for boardrooms. In 2016 the company debuted Microflex Advance (MXA) Array Microphones for conference room audio, including the MXA310 Table Array and the MXA910 Ceiling Array, which introduced "steerable coverage" technology.

In 2017 Shure released the IntelliMix P300 Audio Conferencing Processor, with centralized acoustic echo cancellation, noise reduction, and automatic mixing. SystemOn Audio Asset Management software was released in 2018, for IT/AV managers to remotely monitor networked audio gear across large corporate buildings.

In 2019 Shure announced Microflex Complete Wireless (MXCW), consisting of wireless conferencing units which include a microphone, loudspeaker, interpretation audio, controls, and touchscreen, intended for conferences, meetings, and events inside government, corporate, hotel, and educational facilities.

In 2020 Shure introduced IntelliMix Room, offering DSP algorithms as native Windows software for video conferencing.

In 2023 Shure launched the MXA902, an integrated conferencing ceiling array and a wide-dispersion loudspeaker in a single form factor. In 2024 it released Microflex Wireless neXt 2 (MXW neXt 2) for hybrid meetings and presentations, followed in 2025 by 4- and 8-channel options.

In 2025, Shure announced the expansion of its Microflex Ecoystem portfolio with the MXP range of passive loudspeakers, including pendant, wall and ceiling mounted models, as well as the MXN-AMP, a multichannel, PoE+ powered networked amplifier.

Also in 2025, Shure launched pre-packaged IntelliMix Room Kits featuring zero-touch provisioning, cloud management, and built-in DSP for Microsoft Teams Rooms, with support for Zoom Rooms following in June 2026. The kits include Intellimix Room DSP software, touch panel, network switch and accessories, in addition to a number of MXA902 Ceiling Array Microphone + Loudspeakers and Huddly cameras depending on room size. Launched in tandem, the Intellimix Foundation System provides the compute and touch panel from the room kits as a standalone base kit, also compatible with both Microsoft Teams Rooms and Zoom Rooms.

=== Wireless microphone systems ===
Shure manufactures several lines of wireless microphone systems, many of them utilizing microphone capsules from their wired microphones models such as the SM58, SM87, Beta 58, and Beta87A. The systems range in scope from entry-level to high-end systems used for touring and large-scale event applications.

In the early 1950s, Shure introduced the Vagabond 88 wireless microphone system. Operating within a copper wire circle either suspended from the ceiling or laid on the floor, the system could transmit within an area of approximately 700 square feet. The system consisted of a low-frequency FM radio transmitter and microphone, utilized five subminiature vacuum tubes, and was powered by two hearing aid batteries. The Vagabond system was expensive and somewhat fragile, but was adopted for use by several Las Vegas venues of the time.

Not until 1990 did Shure re-enter the wireless microphone market with the introduction of the L Series. Even before Shure re-entered the wireless microphone market though, concert engineers commonly specified Shure microphone capsules for the wireless microphone systems they were using. Once Shure introduced its own UHF wireless microphone system, which featured wireless versions of several popular Shure microphones, they no longer made capsules available for other manufacturers' systems. This practice encouraged sales of Shure wireless systems and gained Shure market share in the category. Shure's UHF system featured software control and the ability to operate as many as 78 systems simultaneously.

The ULX series (introduced in 2002) featured their patented "audio reference companding", a level-dependent companding protocol that does not compand low-level audio where the wireless artifacts would be more audible, as well as the ability to scan for clear wireless channels, a less expensive package, and the ability to operate 40 systems simultaneously. The ULX system was awarded a TEC Award in 2002.

In 2005, Shure introduced the SLX series of wireless microphone systems. In 2005, the SLX series was awarded a TEC Award. The following year, The UHF-R series was introduced with audio reference companding as a main feature and "wireless workbench" software for computer coordination and control of frequency selection, customized settings, and synchronization of multi-system components. The UHF-R series received a TEC award in 2006.

In 2011, they introduced their first digital wireless system, PGX-D (PGX Digital) Wireless series, augmenting the released previously entry-priced PGX series. PGX-D Wireless transmits 24-bit/48 kHz digital audio and utilizes the 900 MHz frequency band, and is able to operate with up to five systems simultaneously. Like all Shure wireless, it is available with a variety of popular Shure microphone models, or in bodypack configurations for use with lavalier or headset microphones, or connected to an instrument cable.

In 2011, Shure previewed Axient, a wireless management network, which includes features for spectrum management, interference detection and avoidance, frequency diversity, remote control (including remote configuration of wireless units via the 2.4 GHz "Zigbee" WPAN IEEE 802.15.4 based "Showlink" protocol) and the use of Li-ion rechargeable batteries to eliminate the use of ordinary AA and AAA batteries.

Shure also previewed Wireless Workbench, a desktop application for Mac and Windows designed to monitor and control networked Shure wireless systems, as well as provide tools to coordinate and deploy compatible frequencies. Since its initial release, the application has received numerous updates, and is available to download free from Shure's website.

Shure began shipping Axient in January 2012, and it has been used in venues and events such as the 2012 Summer Olympics and Paralympics opening and closing ceremonies in London.

The Shure ULX-D Digital Wireless System was announced in January 2012 at the NAMM Show. It features 24-bit/48kHz digital audio, a High Density mode that maximizes channel count, Dante digital networking, and secure AES-256 encryption. ULXD4D dual channel digital receiver and ULXD4Q quad channel digital receiver were added in June 2012.

In 2013, Shure introduced the BLX wireless system (to replace the PG and PGX wireless systems) and the GLX-D wireless system, which operates in the 2.4 GHz frequency band.

The Shure QLX-D digital wireless system was introduced in June 2014. It was designed to bridge the gap between mid-tier users and high-end professional setups by offering 24-bit digital audio, 20 Hz to 20 kHz frequency response with >120 dB dynamic range, ethernet connectivity, RF spectral efficiency, remote software control and AES-256 encryption.

Shure debuted the Axient Digital Wireless System on April 23, 2017 at the NAB Show in Las Vegas and has been widely adopted by touring acts, broadcast television, and major theatrical productions. Key highlights of the 2017 release included High Density Mode to maximize channel counts in increasingly crowded RF environments, and ShowLink Control for real-time remote control of transmitters and automatic interference avoidance, as well as 2 ms latency and flat frequency response. Since the initial rollout, Shure has expanded the platform to include ADX-series transmitters and the Axient Digital PSM in-ear monitor system.

In 2020 Shure launched the SLX-D Wireless System for a variety of applications such as classrooms, houses of worship, and corporate facilities, followed by the addition of a Quad-Channel Receiver, as well as Portable Systems aimed at videographers and broadcasters. The legacy SLX-D system was phased out starting February 1, 2026, with SLX-D+ transmitters providing backwards compatibility with SLXD-receivers (running on standard SLX-D features).

In 2023, Shure introduced the GLX-D+ Dual Band Wireless System for musicians, vocalists, and presenters. This systems operates across both 2.4 GHz and 5.8 GHz bands, increasing available bandwidth while scanning and switching frequencies to avoid Wi-Fi and heavy-traffic interference. The SB904 lithium-ion battery delivers up to 12 hours of runtime, with quick-charge providing 1.5 hours of use from a 15-minute charge. Available configurations include tabletop, rack-mount (GLXD4R+), and an all-metal guitar pedal design (GLXD6+) that integrates into a pedalboard.

Shure announced the MoveMic wireless microphone line on March 4, 2024. The MoveMic 88+ is a direct-to-phone wireless stereo microphone designed for content creators and videographers. It features four selectable polar patterns (Stereo, Mono Cardioid, Mono Bi-directional, and Raw Mid-Side) for various shooting environments, and Advanced DSP to control compression, EQ, gain, and built-in noise reduction. On March 4, 2025, the lineup was expanded with the announcement of the MoveMic 88+ Stereo Microphone, which plugs directly in to iPhone and Android devices via the USB-C port.

The Shure SLX-D+ Wireless Microphone System was launched at NAMM in February 2026 as the successor to the SLX-D platform. Key new features include an expanded 138 MHz tuning range (region dependent), ShowLink Ease, automatic interference management, digital feedback reduction via built-in DSP. Shure offers SLX-D+ in 18 configurations across single-, dual- (half-rack space), and quad-channel formats, including Wireless Handheld, Wireless Guitar System, Wireless Plug-on System and Dual-channel Digital Wireless Receiver.

=== Personal monitors ===
Shure entered the personal monitoring system category in 1997 with the introduction of the PSM 600. In-ear personal monitoring systems enable a performer or public speaker to monitor audio separately from the amplified sound for the audience. Prior to in-ear monitoring, this was usually accomplished by monitor speakers placed on the stage and oriented toward the performer or speaker and away from the audience, and usually with its own separate "monitor mix" of audio. An in-ear monitor system isolates the monitor mix without the interference of other background sounds, and reduces the risk of other complications like feedback.

In 2000, the Shure PSM 400 Personal Stereo Monitor system was awarded a TEC Award. Shure introduced the PSM 900 Personal Monitor System at the 2010 Winter NAMM Show.

=== Earphones ===
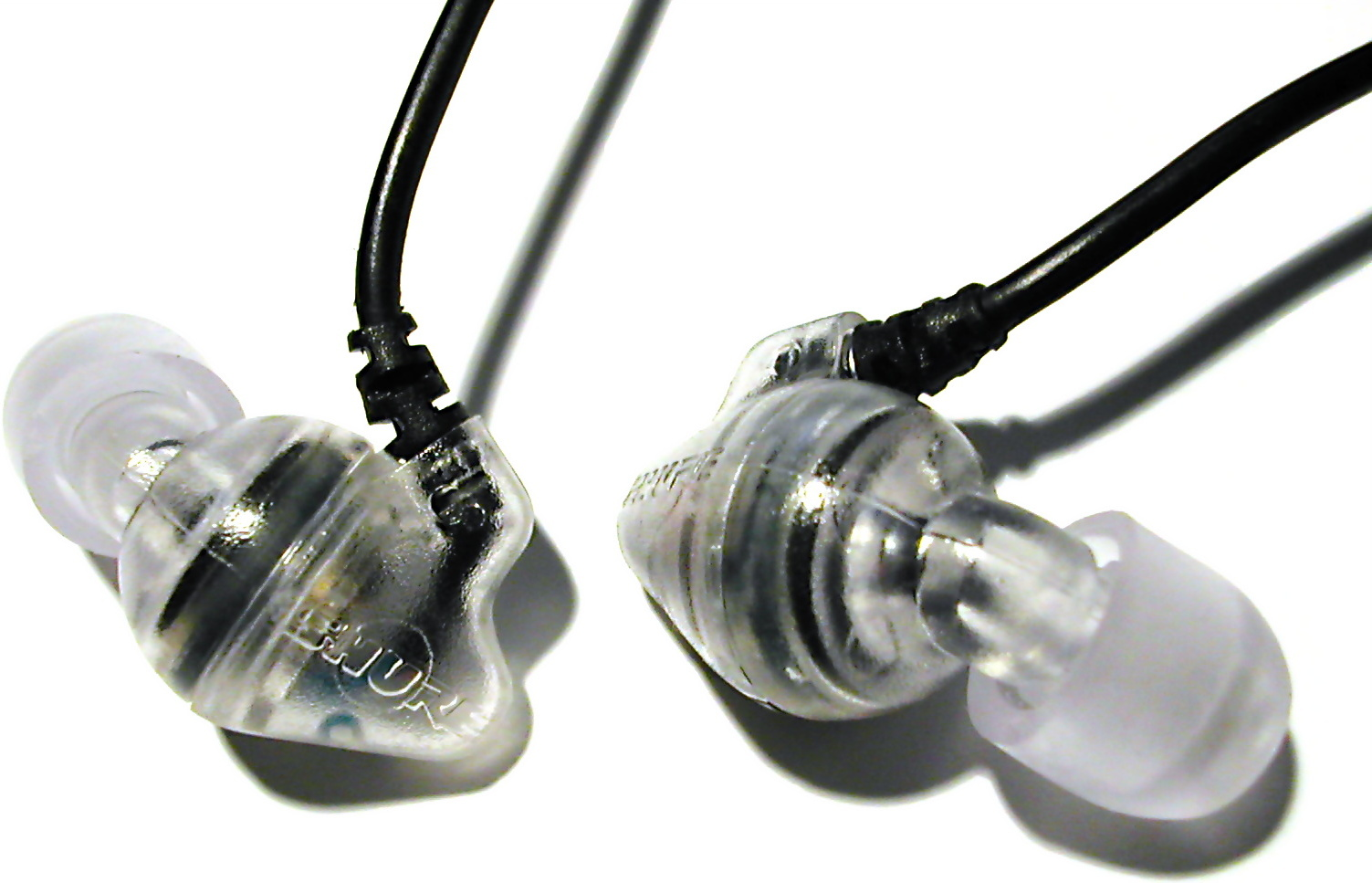
A pair of Shure E2C earphones

Shure also offers in-ear monitor-styled earphones as a part of a personal monitor system package or as an independent purchase, as these earphones are also suitable for music listening on portable audio devices such as MP3 players.

=== Headphones ===
Shure started offering around-ear headphones in May 2009, and since then expanded their lineup to cater to different listening needs, from basic listening to audiophile-demanding listening.

In October 2014, Shure began to offer on-ear, portable headphones in semi-open back and closed back designs. The closed back model is optionally available with an inline microphone and remote to control iOS devices, creating offerings in each of three segments of "Portable", "Studio/Professional", and "Premium/Audiophile" models.

== Awards ==
- 1943–1946: Army-Navy "E" Award and 3 "E" Stars for excellence in production awarded to Shure
- 1990: FP410 recognized with the Technical Achievement Award from the International Television Association for "significantly advancing the state of the art in the field of non-network television".
- 2003: Shure Incorporated awarded the National Academy of the Recording Arts and Sciences Technical GRAMMY, awarded to individuals and/or companies that have made outstanding contributions of technical significance to the recording industry
- 2004: Shure SM57 microphone inducted to the TECnology Hall of Fame
- 2006: Shure was named one of "Chicago's 101 Best and Brightest Companies to Work For."
- 2007: Shure SE530 awarded iLounge Best of 2007/Deluxe Earphone of the Year
- 2007: Shure SE530 awarded Windows Vista magazine Editor's Choice Award
- 2007: Shure SE530 awarded PC World magazine "100 Best Products of 2007"
- 2008: Shure Unidyne Model 55 microphone inducted to the TECnology Hall of Fame
- 2014: IEEE Milestone Award Winner. Unidyne Microphone. World's first unidirectional, single element, dynamic microphone.
- 2025: DCA901 – TV Tech 2025 Media & Entertainment: Best in Market Awards; IBC Best of Show
- 2025: Microflex Wireless neXt 4 and neXt 8 – NSCA Excellence in Product Innovation Awards: Best Cyber-Protected AV Product for Education; Tech & Learning Higher Education Category Winner
- 2025: IntelliMix Room Kits – NSCA Excellence in Product Innovation Awards: Best AI-Infused Enterprise AV Solution; Best of Show ISE 2025 (AV Technology)
- 2025: ANX4 Scalable Wireless Receiver – InfoComm Best of Show (Mix)
- 2025: Axient Digital PSM – IBC Best of Show (Radio World); Best of Show NAB 2025 (Mix); Best of Show ISE 2025 (Mix)
- 2025: Microflex Loudspeakers – InfoComm Best of Show (Installation International); Best New Loudspeakers (rAVe/SCN Best of ISE 2025)
- 2025: IntelliMix Foundation System – InfoComm Best of Show (Sound & Video Contractor)
- 2025: Microflex Wireless neXt 4 and neXt 8 – Favorite New EdTech Product (rAVe Readers’ Choice Awards); Best EDU Wireless Audio Solution (rAVe Best of InfoComm 2025); Commercial Integrator BEST Award – Audio Conferencing Solutions
- 2025: MX Loudspeakers – Most Innovative Speaker Solution (Installed) (Systems Contractor News)
- 2025: Shure (User Guides; Customer Experience Team; Wireless Workbench and ShureCloud) – Systems Contractor News Stellar Service Awards: Supporting Content (Silver); Tech Support (Gold); Value Added Service (Platinum)
- 2025: MV7i – Rolling Stone Audio Awards: Best Podcasting Microphone; TWICE CES Picks Award
- 2025: SLX-D Portable Systems – NAMM TEC Awards: Wireless Technology Category
- 2025: Microflex Wireless neXt 4 and neXt 8 – Top New Technology Awards (ISE 2025): Microphones Category
- 2026: IntelliMix Bar Pro – Best of ISE 2026 (rAVe [PUBS]) – Best Videoconferencing Product; Best of Show ISE 2026 (AV Technology)
- 2026: IntelliMix Room Kits – Inavation Awards 2026 (ISE): Collaboration & Communication
- 2026: IntelliMix Foundation System – Best of Show ISE 2026 (Installation)
- 2026: DCA901 – Best of Show ISE 2026 (Mix)
- 2026: IntelliMix Bar Pro – Top New Technology Awards 2026 (ISE): Best Video Bars Category
- 2026: Shure (DCA901 with Savannah Bananas) – Systems Contractor News Stellar Service Awards: Commissioning/Deployment (Platinum)

=== TEC Awards and nominations ===
Shure was nominated for (and won) other TEC Awards:

- 1991
  - VP88 Stereo MS microphone
- 1994
  - Beta87 microphone
- 1996
  - Beta58A microphone (Winner)
- 1999
  - KSM32 microphone
  - PSM 600 Personal Monitors
- 2000
  - PSM700 Personal Stereo Monitor
- 2001
  - PSM400 Personal Monitors (Winner)
  - FP24 small format mixer
  - KSM44 microphone
- 2002
  - Beta 98H/C microphone
  - ULX Series Wireless (Winner)
  - Auxpander sound reinforcement mixer
- 2003
  - SM86 microphone (Winner)
- 2004 TECnology Hall of Fame
  - SM57 microphone
- 2005
  - SLX Series Wireless (Winner)
- 2006
  - E4c Earphones (Winner)
  - UHF-R Wireless Microphone System (Winner)
- 2007
  - KSM9 microphone
- 2009
  - URI-M Micro Bodypack
- 2010
  - SRH840 pro monitoring headphones
  - PSM900 Personal Monitor System
  - Beta 27 microphone
- 2012
  - Beta 181 microphone
  - PGX-D Digital Wireless System
- 2013
  - AXIENT Wireless Systems
- 2015
  - GLXD6 Guitar Pedal Receiver with Tuner
- 2016
  - ShurePlus MOTIV Mobile Recording App
  - MOTIV MV88 iOS Digital Stereo Condenser Mic (winner)
  - 5575LE Unidyne 75th Anniversary Vocal Microphone (winner)
- 2017
  - KSM8 Dualdyne Dynamic Microphone (winner)
  - KSE1500 Electrostatic Earphone System
- 2018
  - Headphone/Earpiece Technology: KSE1200
  - Wireless Technology: Axient Digital Wireless (winner)
- 2019
  - Audio Apps & Hardware/Peripherals for Smartphones & Tablets: MV88+ Video Kit
  - Microphones - Sound Reinforcement: Twinplex
- 2020
  - Wireless Technology: Axient Digital ADX Transmitter (winner)
- 2021
  - Headphone/Earpiece Technology: AONIC 50
  - Wireless Technology: Axient Digital AD3 plug-on wireless transmitter (winner)
- 2022
  - Audio Apps & Hardware/Peripherals for Smartphones & Tablets: Wireless Workbench 6.14.1 (winner)
- 2023
  - Audio Education Technology: Microphone Techniques for Recording Educational Booklet
  - Headphone/Earpiece Technology: SRH840A Professional Studio Headphones
  - Microphones - Sound Reinforcement: KSM11 Wireless Cardioid Condenser Vocal Microphone
- 2024
  - Audio Education Technology: Wireless Workbench 7 Education Series (winner)
- 2025
  - Wireless Technology: SLX-D Portable Digital Wireless Systems (winner)
- 2026
  - Audio Education Technology: Axient Digital PSM ‘How To’ Series (winner)
  - Wireless Technology: Axient Digital PSM Advanced Digital In-Ear Monitor System (winner)
  - Microphones – Recording: SM4 Home Recording Microphone
  - Microphones – Sound Reinforcement: Nexadyne Instrument Microphones

== See also ==
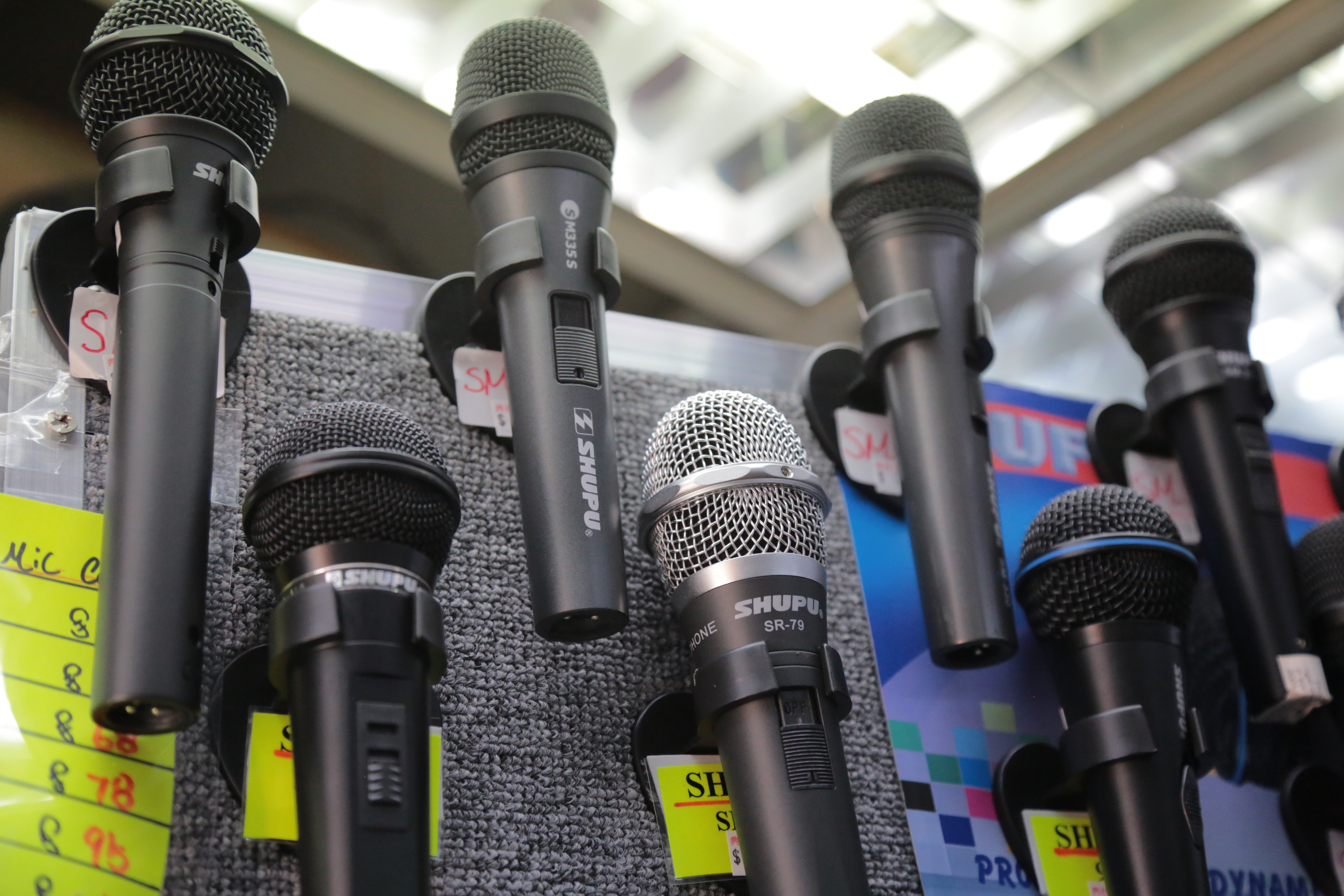
'Shupu' imitation Shure microphones in Hong Kong

- List of microphone manufacturers
