= Pop filter =

Noise protection filter for microphones

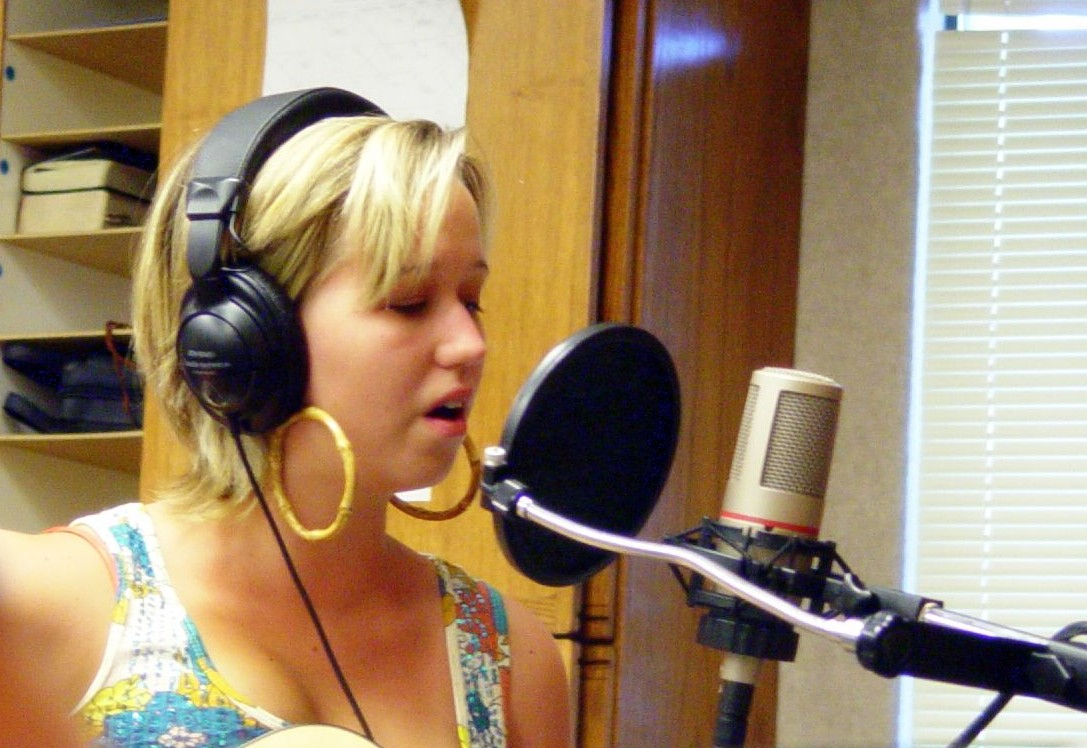
A pop filter between microphone and singer in use during a recording session

A pop filter, pop shield or pop screen is a noise protection filter for microphones, typically used in a recording studio. It serves to reduce or eliminate popping sounds caused by the mechanical impact of fast-moving air on the microphone from plosives during recorded speech and singing. Pop filters can also keep saliva off the microphone during recording.

== Background ==
Popping sounds occur particularly in the pronunciation of aspirated plosives (such as the first p in the English word popping). Other plosives can be t, k, d, b, and g sounds. The popping sound recorded by a microphone has two components: the high-frequency component, caused by air moving past the grille or other parts of the microphone body, and the low-frequency component, caused by air impacting the diaphragm. Mechanical and electrical saturation (e.g. clipping) can also play a role depending on the amount of headroom designed into these systems.

== Construction ==
A typical pop filter is composed of one or more layers of acoustically semi-transparent material such as woven nylon stretched over a circular frame and often includes a clamp and a flexible mounting bracket. Metal pop filters use a fine mesh metal screen in place of the nylon. Some studio condenser microphones have an integral pop filter built into their design.

Metal pop filters are durable and designed with wider holes, having less effect on high frequencies.

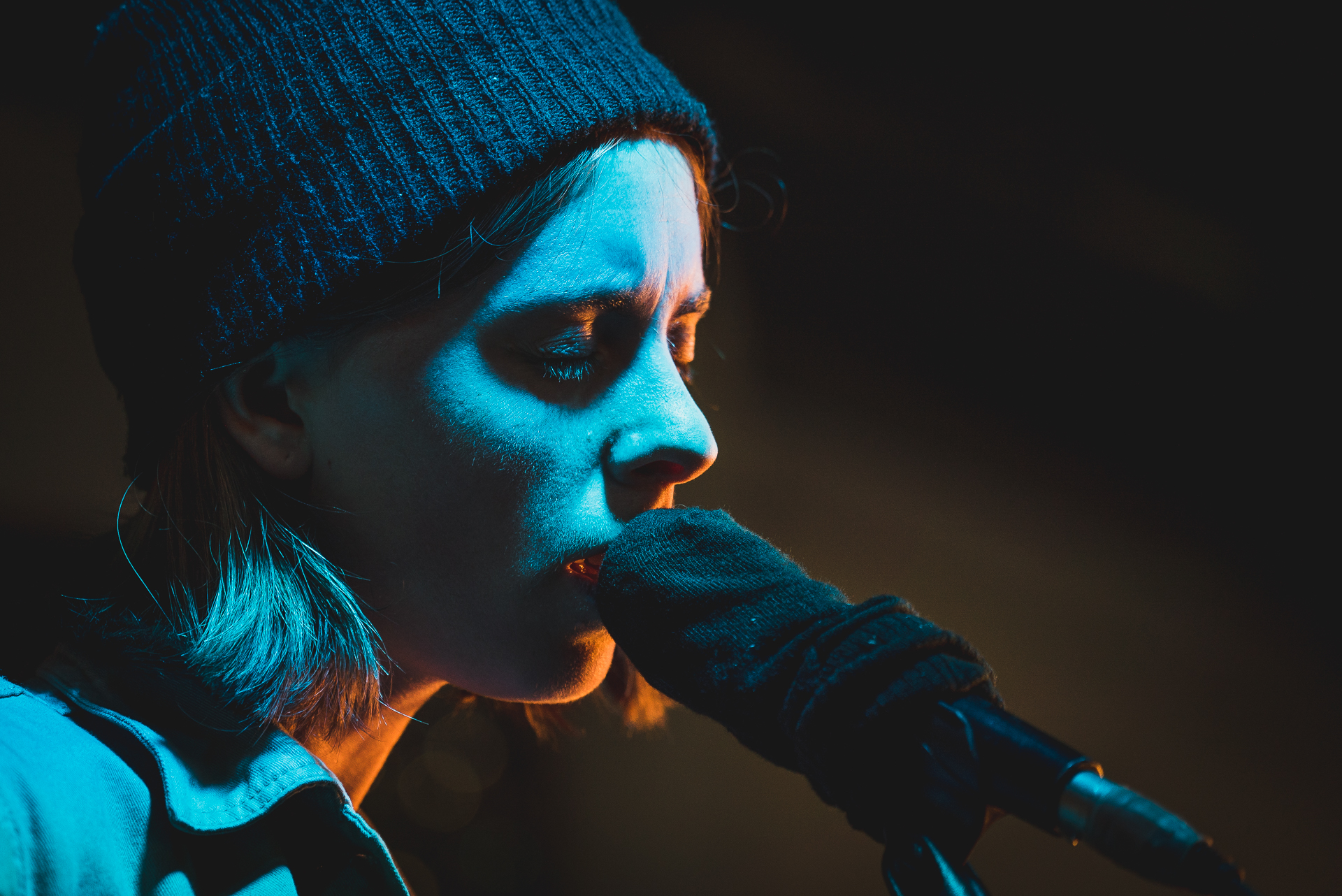
Meg Duffy using a microphone with a sock

An improvised pop shield, functionally identical to the professional units, can be made with material from tights or stockings stretched over a kitchen sieve, embroidery hoop or a loop of wire, such as a bent clothes hanger. It is important that the pop shield not be attached directly to the microphone, as vibrations will be transmitted from the shield to the microphone.

== Function ==
Pop filters are designed to attenuate the energy of the plosive, which otherwise might exceed the design input capacity of the microphone, leading to clipping. In effect, the plosive's discrete envelope of sound energy is intercepted and broken up by the strands of the filter material before it can impinge on, and momentarily distort, the sensitive diaphragm of the microphone. Pop filters do not appreciably affect hissing sounds or sibilance, for which de-essing is used.

Additionally, a pop filter can protect against the accumulation of saliva on the microphone element. Salts in human saliva are corrosive, so the use of a pop filter may improve the lifespan of the microphone.

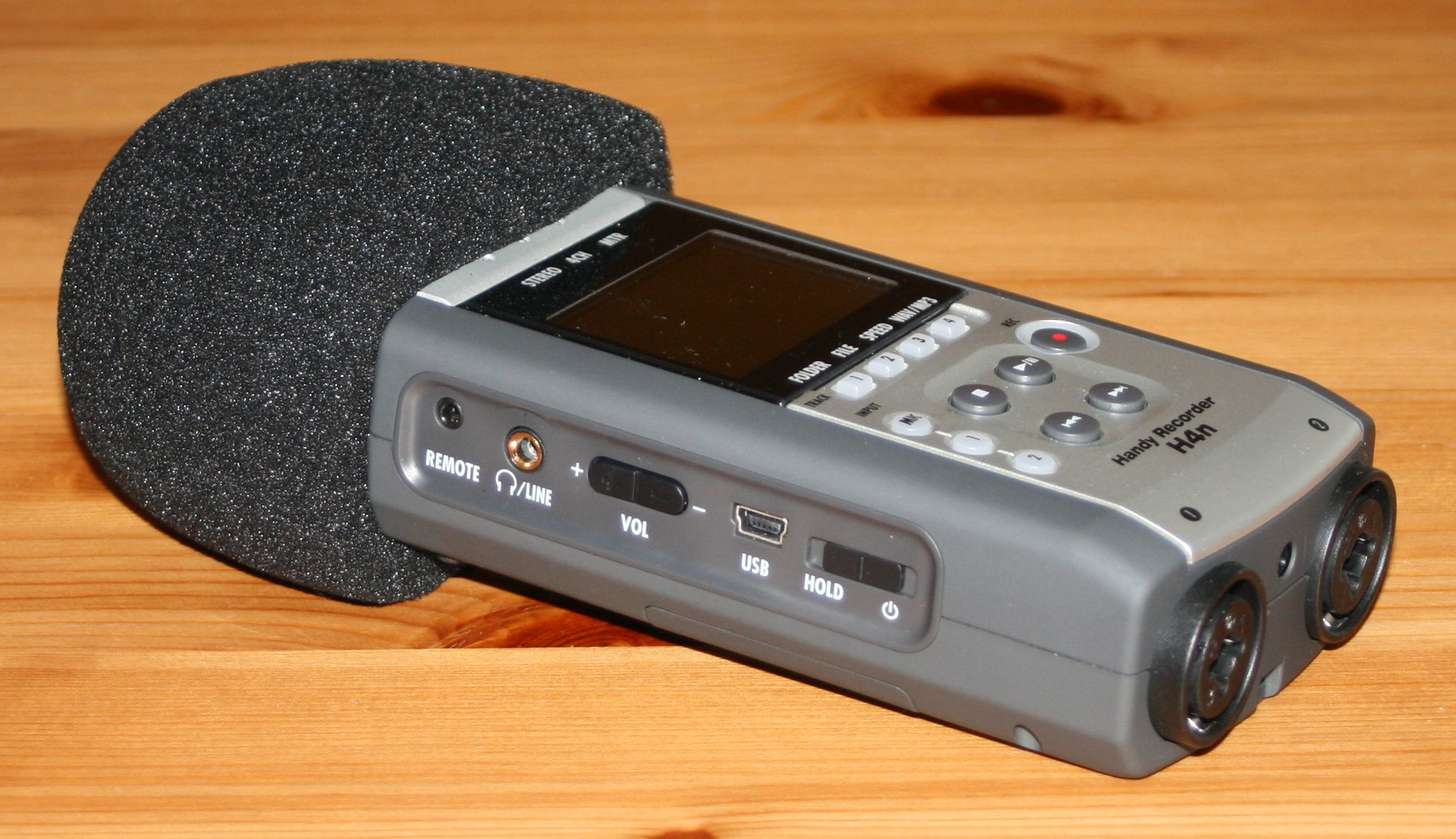
A windscreen on a portable recorder with integrated microphones

A pop filter differs from a microphone windscreen. Pop filters are generally used in a studio environment to help improve the sound quality of the recorded voice, while windscreens are typically used outdoors and get rid of any low distortion. Windscreens are also used by vocalists on stage to reduce plosives and saliva, though they may not be as acoustically transparent as a studio pop filter.

== Setup ==
The position of the pop filter depends on the amount of power the artist is going to communicate while recording. The position of the pop filter is different in different recording situations, with a further position from the microphone causing fewer pop sounds. More distance means increasing the microphone gain and gaining more room noise. Normally, to get good quality, the pop filter should be placed about 2–6 inches (5–15 cm) away from the microphone.

== See also ==
- Microphone § Windscreens
