= List of microphone manufacturers =

The following is a list of current microphone manufacturers, including manufactures of all different types of microphone, excluding small microphones such MEMS microphones in most smartphone models.

== Current microphone manufacturers ==
- Akai
- AKG
- Astatic
- AEA Ribbon Mics
- Audio-Technica
- Behringer
- Beyerdynamic
- Blue Microphones
- Brauner
- Brüel & Kjær
- CAD Audio
- Core Sound LLC
- DJI
- DPA
- Earthworks
- Electro-Voice
- Fostex
- Gauge Precision Instruments
- Gentex Corp
- Grundig
- Heil Sound
- JZ Microphones
- Lauten Audio
- Lewitt
- Line 6
- Manley Laboratories
- M-Audio
- Microtech Gefell
- Milab
- MIPRO
- Nady Systems, Inc.
- Georg Neumann GmbH
- Nevaton
- NTi Audio
- Oktava
- PCB Piezotronics
- Peavey Electronics
- Philips
- Røde Microphones
- Royer Labs
- Schoeps
- Sennheiser
- Shure
- Sony
- TASCAM/TEAC Corporation
- Telefunken
- TOA Corp.
- Zoom Corporation

== Defunct microphone manufacturers ==
The following is a list of defunct microphone manufacturers with articles.

- Aiwa
- Altec Lansing
- American Microphone
- Ampex
- Astatic
- Brush Development Company
- Dynaco
- Lafayette
- Motorola
- Philco
- RCA
- Realistic
- Reslosound
- Turner Microphone Company
- Voice of Music
- Webster-Chicago
- Western Electric
- Westinghouse
