= RCA Studios New York =

Former recording studio in New York City

RCA Victor Studios New York were music recording studios established by RCA Victor in New York City, including its studio at 155 East 24th Street which was active from 1928 to 1969, and its successor at 1133 Avenue of the Americas which was active from 1969 to 1993.

== History ==
=== Background ===
Beginning in 1901, the Victor Talking Machine Company produced its earliest recordings at various locations in Philadelphia, New York City and at its headquarters in Camden, New Jersey. Some early recordings included "The Memphis Blues" (1914), credited as the first recorded blues song. and "Livery Stable Blues" by the Original Dixieland Jass Band (1917).

=== 155 East 24th Street (1928–1969) ===
In early 1928, after decades of recording in various locations, Victor acquired a property in Manhattan to build a recording studio. Originally built in 1907 as a seven-story stable, the building at 155 East 24th Street was previously home to Manhattan's leading supplier of coach, livery, and workhorses, supplying horses for the New York transit system, and later to the U.S. military for use in World War I. After the Radio Corporation of America purchased the Victor Talking Machine Company in 1929, the company became RCA Victor, and the studio became RCA Victor Studios.

The facilities consisted of Studios A and B (also referred to as Studios 1 and 2), designed by Victor employee John E. Volkmann. Studio A was the larger studio, with space to accommodate up to 35 musicians. Studio B was smaller, and used for piano and chamber music recordings. The shared control room was equipped with a simple RCA mixing console designed and built by its own engineering department, as were the studio's most popular microphones, the RCA 44 and RCA 77. Recordings were made on hot wax, so musicians had to wait a week for test pressings to hear what they recorded.

Many notable recordings were produced at the studio in the 1930s, including Hoagy Carmichael and his Orchestra's original 1930 recording of "Georgia on My Mind", Artie Shaw and His Orchestra's 1938 recording of "Begin the Beguine", and Glenn Miller and His Orchestra's 1939 recordings of "In the Mood" and "Moonlight Serenade", as well as their hit "Pennsylvania 6-5000" the following year. Other artists recording at the studios in the 1930s included Bix Beiderbecke and Charlie Barnet. In May 1933, Jimmie Rodgers recorded what would become his final sessions at the studio.

On February 17, 1948, the organizational meeting that led to the formation of the Audio Engineering Society was held at the studios, as was the first AES technical membership meeting held on March 11, with RCA Victor engineer Harry F. Olson as guest speaker.

In the early 1950s, Eddie Fisher recorded several hit songs at the studio, including "Anytime" (1951), "Tell Me Why" (1951), and "Wish You Were Here" (1952). In January 1956, Elvis Presley recorded "Blue Suede Shoes" at the studio, returning in February and again in July, during which he recorded his hits "Hound Dog" and "Don't Be Cruel". In July 1959, The Isley Brothers recorded their hit song "Shout" and subsequent debut studio album from the group. Other artists recording in the studio in the 1950s included Perry Como, Harry Belafonte, Lena Horne, Hugo Winterhalter, Jaye P. Morgan, The Ames Brothers, and Neil Sedaka.

By 1969, RCA felt its 24th Street studios were too small, obsolete, and no longer competitive, and opened new recording studios within a new building at 1133 Avenue of the Americas. The 155 East 24th Street building was later sold to the City College of New York, who used building until 1998, after which it was razed to facilitate construction of the Baruch College Newman Vertical Campus.

=== 1133 Avenue of the Americas (1969–1993) ===
In 1969, RCA consolidated its corporate offices and opened new recording studios within a new building located at 1133 Avenue of the Americas. RCA's Sixth Avenue Studios comprised five recording studios, including Studio A, a 60 x 100-foot room with 30-foot ceiling, nine tape mastering rooms and five lacquer mastering channels. These facilities were often used for classical recordings and numerous original Broadway cast recordings of shows.

RCA closed its Sixth Avenue Studios in 1993, with the space later becoming offices, and eventually becoming the world headquarters for Steinway & Sons.

=== Other RCA New York Studios ===
RCA Victor also used the Manhattan Center on West 34th Street, the opera house originally built in 1906 by Oscar Hammerstein I, and Webster Hall on East 11th Street, where RCA built a small control room off to the side of ballroom. From the late 1920s through the 1940s, RCA Victor also occasionally recorded at Liederkranz Hall on East 58th Street.
