= Røde Microphones =

Australian audio technology company

Freedman Electronics Pty Ltd t/a RØDE Freedman Electronics Pty Ltd
- Formerly: Freedman Electronics (1967–1990)
- Company type: Private
- Industry: Consumer and professional audio equipment
- Founded: 1967; 59 years ago
- Founders: Astrid & Henry Freedman; Peter Freedman
- Headquarters: Silverwater, Sydney, Australia
- Area served: Global
- Key people: Peter Freedman AM (Chairman); Damien Wilson (CEO)
- Products: Microphones, audio mixers
- Number of employees: 800+
- Website: rode.com

Røde Microphones (/ˈroʊd/), officially Freedman Electronics Pty Ltd, is an Australian audio technology company specialising in the design and manufacture of microphones, headphones, audio interfaces, and audio software. The company's product range focuses on applications such as music recording, location sound recordings, broadcast and podcasting, filmmaking, and content creation, for the consumer, producer, and professional markets.

== History ==
Freedman Electronics was founded in 1967 by Henry Freedman, a London-born sound engineer, and his Swedish-born wife, Astrid. The couple moved to Stockholm in 1952. While working for a telecommunications company, Freedman provided after-hours servicing and modifications for a local agent representing the German pro-audio manufacturer Dynacord. Eventually, he was granted the distribution rights in Australia to sell the brand, which led to them emigrating to Australia in 1966 with their family, which included their son, Peter.

Establishing a shop in the suburb of Ashfield near Sydney, Freedman Electronics became one of the earliest companies in the city to design, manufacture, install, and service audio products, such as loudspeakers, amplifiers, and microphones.

Peter Freedman took control of the business after Henry died in 1987. Peter made substantial investments in expanding Freedman Electronics sound installation services. However, his limited business experience, coupled with the challenging economic conditions of the late 1980s, nearly pushed the company to bankruptcy and left Peter burdened with significant financial debt.

As the 1990s dawned, Freedman Electronics faced financial challenges. While exploring other ventures, he recalled a large-diaphragm condenser microphone he had encountered a decade earlier at a trade show in China. After assessing local market interest, he imported 20 of these microphones.

The modified microphone achieved immediate success. This led to the informal nickname 'Rodent-1' for the microphone, which was later rebranded as the Røde NT1, thereby establishing the Røde Microphones brand. The addition of the 'Ø' character paid homage to the Freedman family's Scandinavian heritage (although Swedish itself uses the 'Ö' character) to impart a European flair to the brand. In 1992, Røde introduced the NT2 large-diaphragm condenser microphone following the release of the NT1.

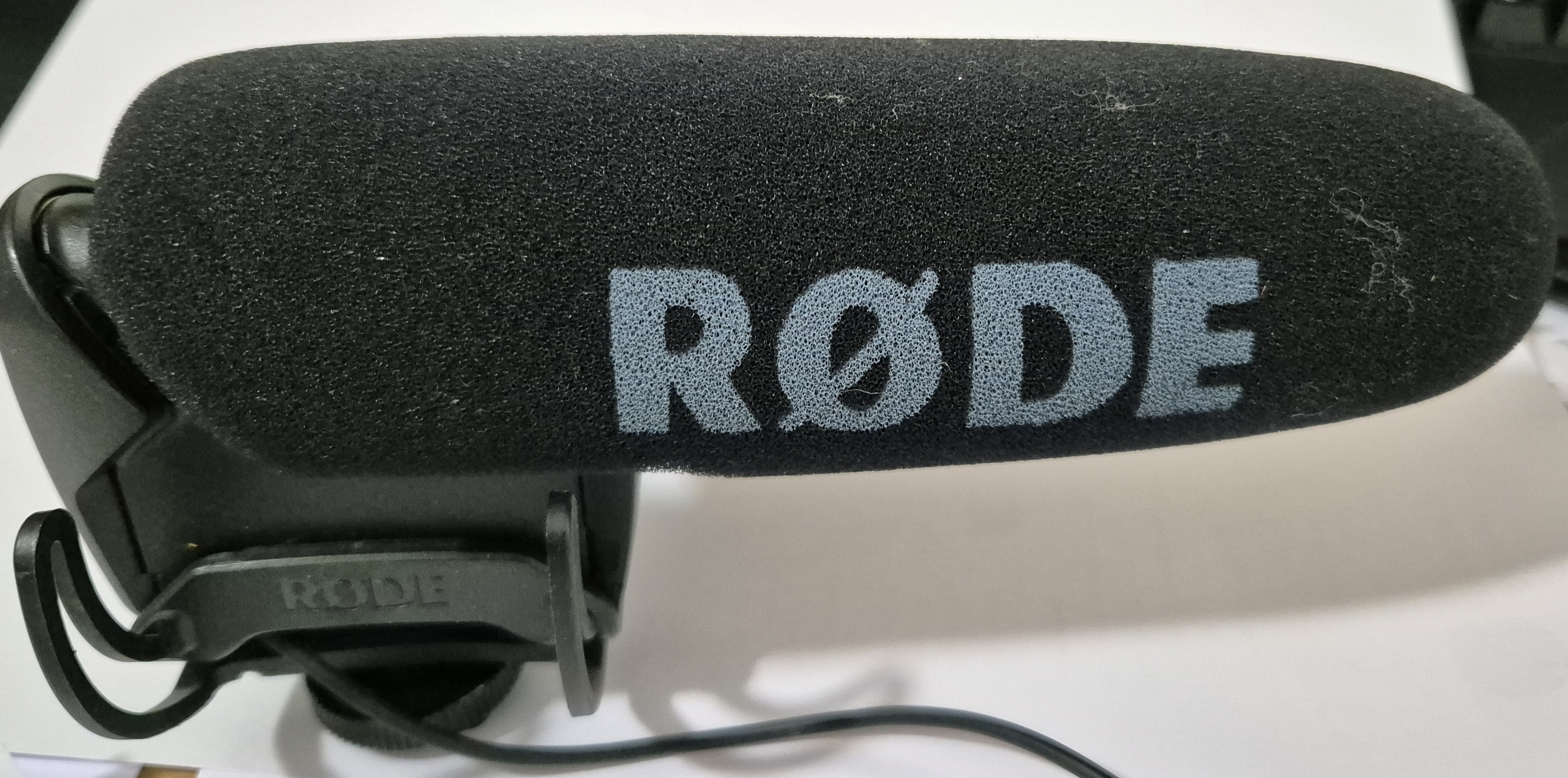

In 2006, Freedman Electronics purchased loudspeaker manufacturer Event Electronics, a company that had been instrumental in establishing RØDE's US distribution channel in the early 1990s. In 2007, in response to the growing podcasting industry, Røde introduced its first dedicated podcasting product, the Podcaster—a dynamic USB microphone. Røde has released additional podcast-focused products, such as the NT-USB and Procaster microphones, which have become popular choices among podcasters.

In 2018, Røde unveiled the RødeCaster Pro, an 'integrated podcast production studio.' This system incorporates several components including a mixer with microphone inputs and headphone outputs, sound pads, and channels designed for seamless integration with remote callers.

In 2019, Røde launched the Wireless Go compact wireless microphone system. Building upon technology initially introduced in the mid-2000s with the RødeLink range of wireless microphones, the Wireless Go received positive reviews. Its compact size and form factor, featuring a built-in microphone within the transmitter pack, enabled entirely wireless operation.

In 2023, Røde acquired the American professional audio company Mackie.

== See also ==
- List of microphone manufacturers
