= RCA Type 77-DX microphone =

Ribbon microphone

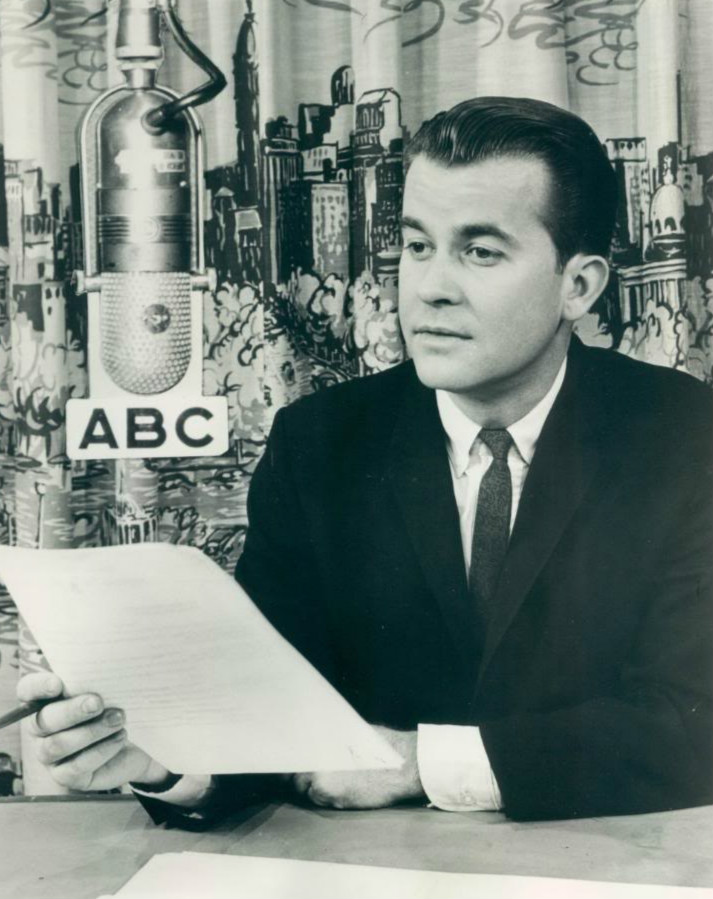
An RCA 77-D used by Dick Clark

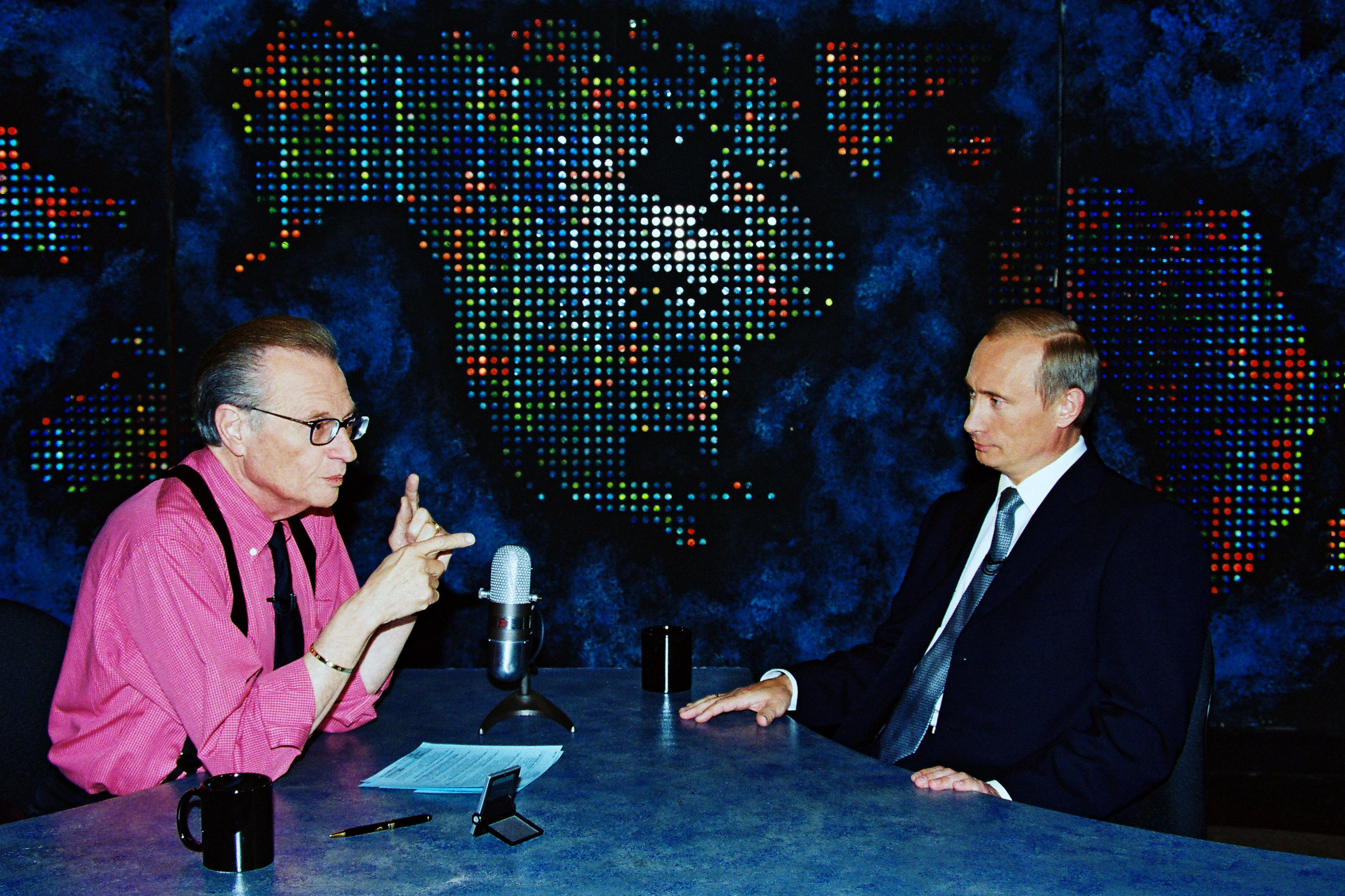
Larry King with Vladimir Putin in 2000

The RCA Type 77-DX microphone is a poly-directional ribbon microphone, or pressure-gradient microphone, introduced by the RCA Corporation in 1954. It was preceded by the Type 77-D introduced in 1948. Its popularity and classic design has resulted in the 77-DX becoming an iconic microphone, used by broadcasters and media personalities such as Edward R. Murrow, David Letterman and Larry King.

== Diaphragm ==
The diaphragm of the 77-DX and other early RCA ribbon microphones is a very thin (2.5 microns) metal ribbon crimped with 19 pitch 90-degree perpendicular corrugations. This very lightweight ribbon is suspended under very little tension. As the ribbon vibrates, a voltage is induced at right angles to both the ribbon velocity and magnetic field direction and is picked off by contacts at the ends of the ribbon.

== Controls ==
The directionality of the 77-DX is variable. A rotating backshutter on the acoustic labyrinth, controlled by a screwdriver-operated slot at the rear of the microphone, allows the user to vary the microphone's pattern from omnidirectional in the fully closed position, to cardioid, to figure-8 (bidirectional) in the fully open position. A 3-position switch at the bottom end of the microphone allows the user to control the amount of low-frequency rolloff.

== Response and output characteristics ==
At 1 kHz, the 77-DX has an output of -50 to -56dbm, depending on the pattern selection. The output impedance is user-selectable; factory preset at 250 ohms, and changeable to 30 or 150 ohms. The microphone has a fairly flat response. In the cardioid (unidirectional) pattern, it is level from approximately 150 Hz to 2 kHz, with a slight rise peaking at just under 5 kHz, then dropping approximately 3 dB/octave to 20 kHz.

== User techniques ==
The 77-DX has been used on countless vocal recordings by Bing Crosby, Kate Smith, Frank Sinatra, Elvis Presley, Johnny Cash, Al Green, and many others. It is still sought after today for use in recording brass instruments.

Audio engineers experienced with the 77-DX can position the microphone at different angles to modify its frequency response. For example, with the microphone suspended, tilting it on the horizontal axis will cause the ribbon to sag slightly, resulting in a noticeable boost in the lower-midrange frequencies.

The ribbon is positioned inside the housing in such a way that "p" sounds (plosives) may cause popping sounds, due to the explosion of air directly into the ribbon. A common solution to this problem has been to attach a pencil vertically across the front of the microphone. The pencil deflects a vocalist's breath as it reaches the microphone, and prevents it from hitting the ribbon directly.

== See also ==
- RCA Type 77-A microphone
