= BBC-Marconi Type A microphone =

BBC-Marconi Type A
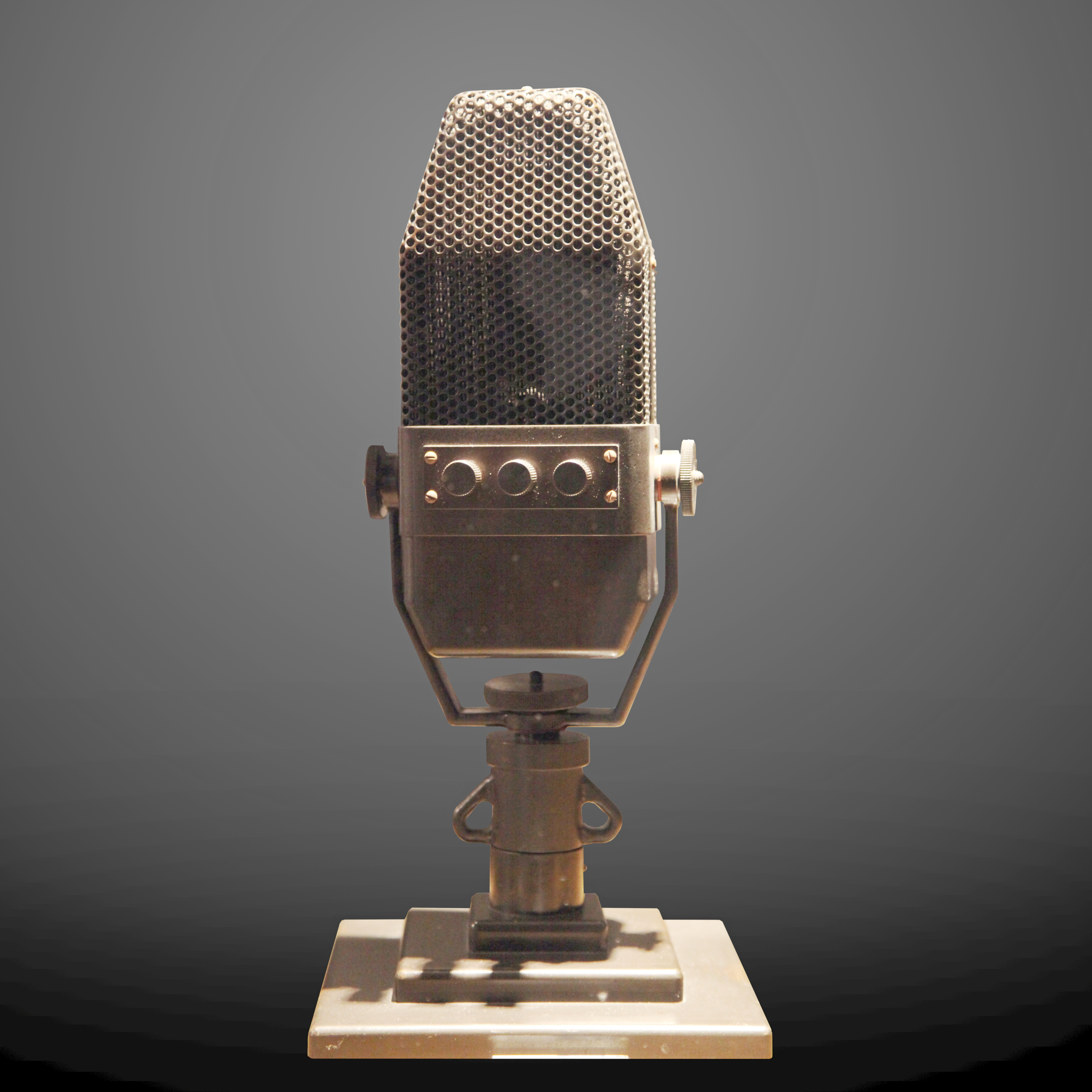
- Type A, c. 1945
- Uses: Broadcasting, Sound recording
- Inventor: F W Alexander
- Manufacturer: BBC/Marconi
- Model: A, AX, AXB, AXBT

L'Appel du 22 juin 1940
General Charles De Gaulle's 18 and 22 June appeals used Type A microphones to broadcast to French forces during World War II

The BBC-Marconi Type A is a ribbon microphone that was produced by the BBC and Marconi between 1934 and 1959. The microphone has been described as "iconic" and a symbol of the BBC.

== History ==
In the early 1930s, the BBC became aware of RCA's model 44 ribbon microphone that was used in Hollywood. Each pair of microphone and amplifier would have cost the BBC £130 (approximately £6,500 in 2009. because of inflation)). As this was not within the BBC's budget, they designed their own microphone, the Type A, alongside Marconi. There were initial concerns that the new design infringed the patent of the RCA microphone, but these were overcome. The Type A was produced at a cost of £9 each (approximately £475 in 2009).

The original Type A microphone was designed by engineer F. W. Alexander under the guidance of H. L. Kirke's Research Department at the BBC.

In 1940, the Type A was used in the broadcast of Charles de Gaulle's 1940 appeals.

In the early 1950s, the BBC began to design the Type A's successor. The first model was the pressure gradient PGD design. In 1953, production began on the PGS (pressure gradient single) ribbon microphone in agreement with the company Standard Telephones and Cables (STC). In the mid-1970s, STC's manufacturing was transferred to Coles Electroacoustics, who continue to manufacture the PGS under the model number 4038.

== Technical ==
Four versions of the microphone were produced – the "A", "AX", "AXB", and "AXBT". The original microphone used a thick aluminium ribbon which produced a harsh resonance. This was soon replaced with a thinner ribbon, and was named Type AX. In 1943, the AXB model was launched, which featured balanced wiring. In 1944, the microphone was renamed the AXBT with the addition of a Ticonal magnet to increase sensitivity by 6 decibels. The AXBT weighed approximately 9.25 pounds (4.20 kg).

The microphone had a figure-of-eight polar pattern. The aluminium ribbon was less than one micrometre thick.

== Sources ==
- BBC (2010), "BBC Microphone", BBC Collection Archive, London: BBC Online, archived from the original on 9 July 2010 (Wayback Machine cached version of page)
- Beckwith, Roger (2009), BBC Type A (1934 onwards), Old BBC Radio Broadcasting Equipment and Memories, archived from the original on 21 June 2007
- Coutant, Stan (2009), STC Brochures, Drums, PA: Coutant.org
- Coutant, Stan (2010), The British Broadcasting Corporation Type AX Marconi Ribbon Microphone, Drums, PA: Coutant.org
- Fisher, David (2009), "1934", Chronomedia, London: Terramedia
- Institution of Electrical Engineers (1961), The Proceedings of the Institution of Electrical Engineers, vol. 108, London: The Institution
- Miller, Ant (2010), BBC R&D Heritage Microphones, London: BBC
- Sargeant, Paul (2010), Looking Back at the BBC, London: BBC
- Science and Society (2010), "BBC Marconi ribbon microphone, type AXBT, 1", Science Museum Picture Library, London: Science Museum
- Shaw, Alan A (2008), BBC Monitors 1922-1960, Haywards Heath, West Sussex: Harbeth Loudspeakers
- Standard Telephones and Cables (1963), 4038 Ribbon Microphone (PDF), London: STC
