= Reslo =

Reslo may refer to:

- Reslo, a Welsh language professional wrestling TV programme produced 1982-1995 for S4C by promoter/wrestler Orig Williams
- Reslosound, known as Reslo for short, former British manufacturers of electrical musical equipment.
- ResLo, a register of the hardware multiplier peripheral on TI MSP430, a mixed-signal microcontroller family from Texas Instruments
