= Lauten =

Lauten is a surname. Notable people with the surname include:

- Carl Lauten, American television director and yoga teacher
- Elodie Lauten (1950–2014), French-born American composer
- Rolf Andreas Lauten, Norwegian curler

== See also ==
- Lauten Audio, American company
- Lautens
