= Nevaton =

European microphone manufacturer

Nevaton is a European manufacturer of high-end studio, film, and broadcast microphones.

== History ==
=== Origins in LOMO ===
The origins of Nevaton can be traced back to 1947, when an acoustic laboratory was established within the Leningrad Optical and Mechanical Association ([LOMO]) in what is now Saint Petersburg, Russia. The lab became part of the newly formed scientific-industrial association EKRAN in 1954. For several decades, the laboratory focused on the research and development of microphones used in the Soviet film and broadcast industries.

=== Nevaton ===
Former LOMO engineers founded Nevaton LTD in 1991 as an independent enterprise, continuing the legacy of precision microphone design in an innovative and highly specialized setting.

In 2024, Nevaton relocated its headquarters to Siegendorf, Austria. This move marked the company's commitment to strengthening its presence within the European Union and enhancing its international profile.

== Products ==
Nevaton designs and manufactures a wide range of microphones, all assembled and tested by hand. The company's catalog includes:

Stereo and multi-channel microphones

- ORTF and ORTF-3D arrays
- Nevaton VR: A-format ambisonic microphone for immersive audio capture
- Nevaton BPT: A Blumlein pair with an additional mid capsule for expanded stereo or surround formats
- Quadraphonic and surround recording microphones

Large-diaphragm condenser microphones

- Dual-diaphragm designs with continuously variable polar patterns
- Fixed-pattern models for specific applications

Small-diaphragm condenser microphones

- the MC59-series, offering a wide selection of interchangeable capsules for various recording needs

== Applications and recognition ==
Nevaton microphones are widely used in professional environments, including:

Concert venues, theatres, and opera houses, such as

- The Salzburg Festival, where Nevaton provides the main microphone system
- The Vienna Burgtheater, ...

High-end audio content creation, such as

- Sound library production for Boom Library
- Top-tier film, broadcast, and studio recordings

== See also ==
- List of microphone manufacturers
