= Schoeps =

German studio condenser microphone manufacturer

Schalltechnik Dr.-Ing. Schoeps GmbH
- Type: Private
- Industry: Audio electronics
- Founded: March 1948
- Headquarters: Karlsruhe, Germany
- Products: Audio equipment
- Website: schoeps.de

Schalltechnik Dr.-Ing. Schoeps GmbH, known as Schoeps or Schoeps Mikrofone, is a German manufacturer of professional studio condenser microphones for recording and broadcast. The privately owned company is based in Karlsruhe, south-west Germany, and was founded in 1948.

CEO of Schoeps GmbH are Karin Fléing and Helmut Wittek.The company is privately owned with Ulrich Schoeps, son of the founder.

== History ==
The company was founded in March 1948 after WWII in Durlach, a small town in Southwest Germany, which is today a district of Karlsruhe. The original name was „Schall-Technik Dr.-Ing. Karl Schoeps". Founder Karl Schoeps and his first employe Wilhelm Küsters studied both Telecommunications Engineering at HKA (formely TH Karlsruhe).

Initially, the two founders focused on sound recording and sound reinforcement technology in general. When sound film experienced its first heyday, the company carried out acoustic calculations for cinema sound systems. In addition, they were involved in the construction of tape recorders, which were produced in small quantities.

In the early years, the company built its first SCHOEPS condenser microphone - the CM 50 - which utilized two of the widely used RV 12 P 2000 vacuum tubes. In this model, the capsule and the microphone body were integrated into a single, very large unit (320 mm in length and 80 mm in diameter).

Thanks to a friendship between Karl Schoeps and a French sales representative who had excellent connections within the broadcasting sector the company was able to establish a significant market position in France as early as the 1950s. At that time, well over half of the company's total production was exported to France.

In 1978 the company became the legal status as limited liability company (GmbH) and in 1980, Ulrich Schoeps, the founder’s son joined the company. In 1986, Ulrich Schoeps became a managing director alongside his father. At the end of 1993, Karl Schoeps passed away. His son took over sole responsibility for running the business, supported by Jörg Wuttke, who became the second shareholder of the company in 1997. Since 2007 is Karin Fléing working at Schoeps; she is media sconsulting expert. In 2015 Ulrich Schoeps retired and the team of Jörg Wuttke as Technical director and Katrin Fleing as Director Sales & Marketing managing the company since than.

Schoeps company remains privately owned, with Ulrich Schoeps as the majority shareholder.

== Microphones ==
All microphones made by Schoeps employ traditional (i.e. externally polarized, not electret) condenser transducers, and use small-diaphragm, single-diaphragm capsules, even in microphones which offer two or three different directional patterns. All models introduced since 1973, as well as some models from even earlier, have featured transformerless output circuitry.

Though a lesser-known brand in the Americas, Schoeps microphones are highly regarded in the classical sound recording and electronics industries of European broadcasting industry. Media organisations such as the German Tagesschau and heute new programmes, as well as the German Bundestag, the Bundesrat and some state parliaments have all used Schoeps products. Since 2005, the Harald Schmidt Show in Germany has utilised their microphones for facilitating guest appearances. This was followed in 2012 by Schoeps equipping the Berlin Phillharmonie with microphones for the live stream of the Digital Concert Hall. Most recently in 2014, the brand provided the main surround sound microphones, together with stereo and individual microphones for the 2014 Brazil World Cup.

=== Colette ===
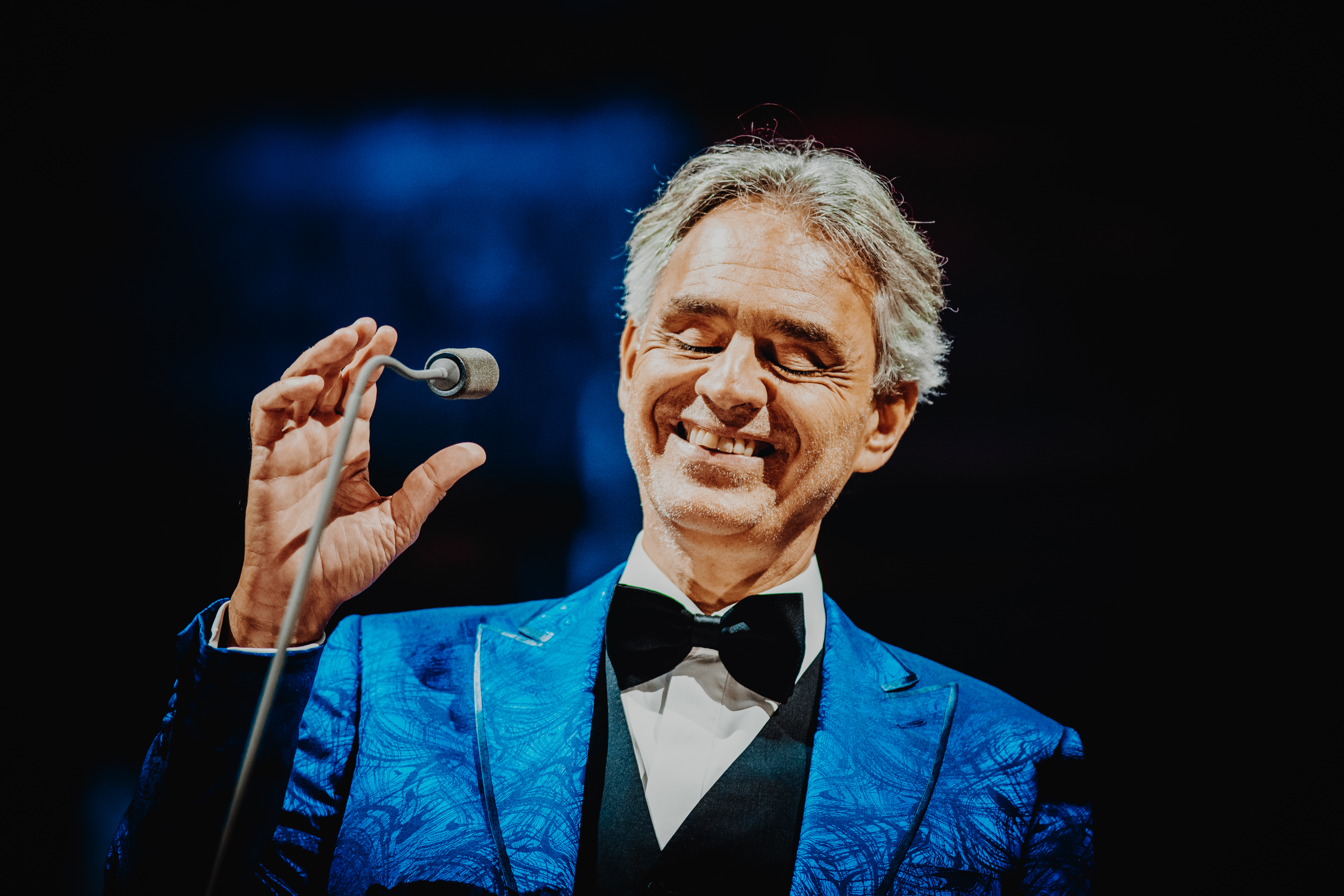
Andrea Bocelli with a Colette microphone at a live concert

In 1974 the Schoeps "Colette" (CMC) series came out, a modular system of microphones that allowed the amplifier to be separated from the sound capsule. The microphone consisted of four amplifiers, for different powering schemes, and about 20 capsules, for different directional patterns and/or frequency response characteristics (any capsule of the series is compatible with any of the amplifiers). This was the first type of microphone to let the user separate the capsule from the amplifier (body) of the microphone, via "active" accessories, e.g. thin, flexible cables, or "goosenecks", for the sake of a less obtrusive microphone setup. In this type of arrangement, the initial amplification stage of the microphone is located in the accessory, at the point where the capsule is connected; this helps to prevent interference or signal losses.

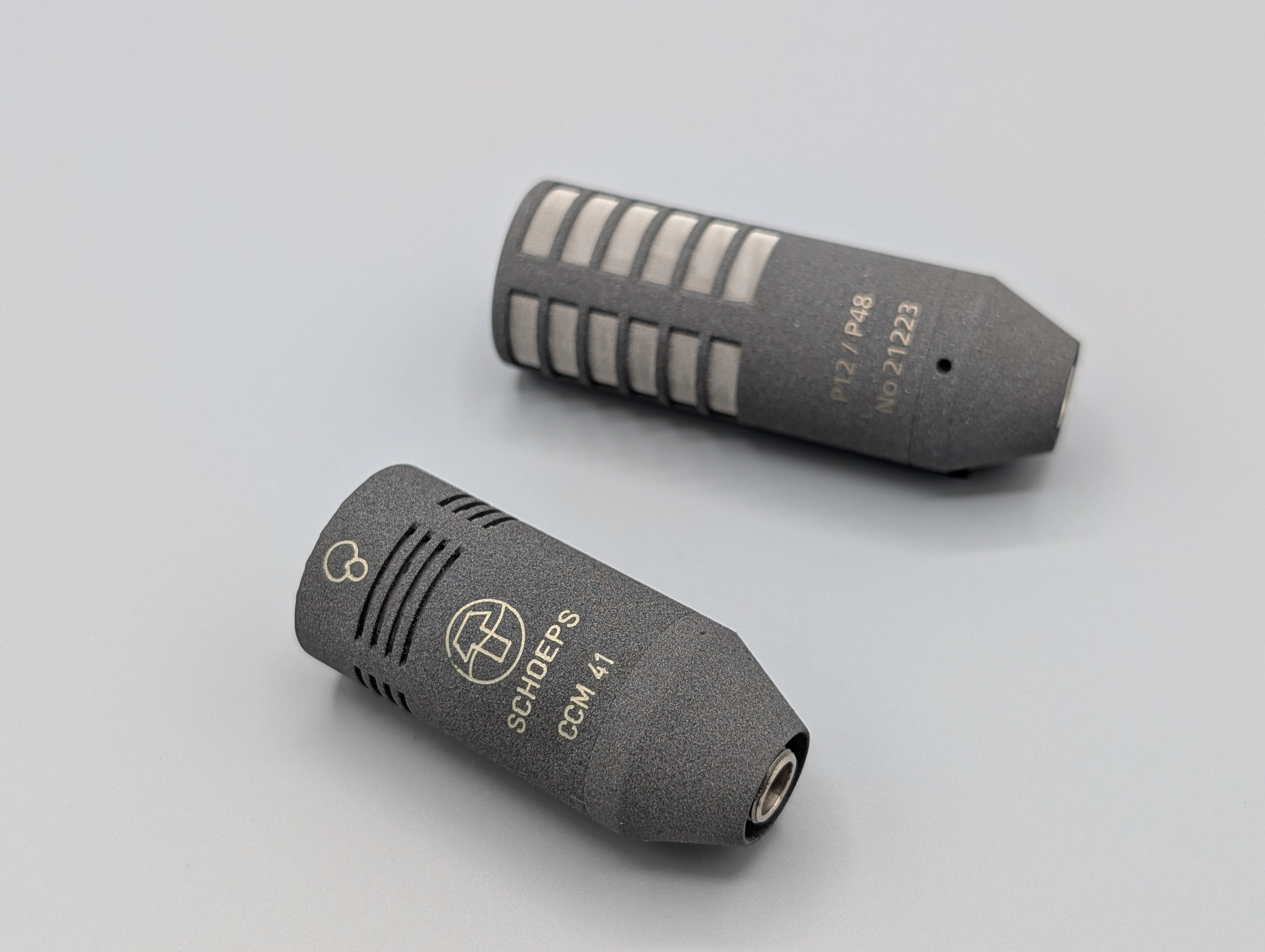
CCM series

Most capsules of the CMC series are also available as one-piece compact microphones ("CCM series"). The CCM compact microphone series was introduced by Schoeps in 1994. The circuitry is miniaturized so that each complete microphone is only a few millimeters longer than the corresponding "Colette" capsule would be. This simplifies installation and reduces the risk of interference in situations which would ordinarily require the use of Colette active accessories. However, since these microphones lack the modular construction of the CMC series, their capsules are not interchangeable.

=== Historical microphones ===
In the vacuum-tube era, Schoeps M 221-series microphones, especially the model M 221 B, were widely used in studios and for live orchestral recording. Their circuitry is based on the Telefunken AC 701k vacuum tube. They were introduced in 1954 and manufactured until the 1970s; many are still in use today.

One particular model of Schoeps microphone created for French radio (the CMT 20 series, 1964) has the historical distinction of being the first phantom-powered condenser microphone on the studio market.

== User ==
Schoeps is represented in Germany across all high-quality public broadcasting news programs: tagesschau, tagesthemen (ARD) and heute (ZDF). Lawmakers also rely on Schoeps: the German Bundestag, the Bundesrat, and several state parliaments use Schoeps microphones.

In 2012, the Berlin Philharmonie was equipped with Schoeps microphones for the live streams of its "Digital Concert Hall". Also Elbphilharmonie uses Schoeps Colette-Series along with Sennheiser/Neumann and DPA Microphones. In 2014, Schoeps supplied the primary surround microphones, as well as stereo and individual microphones, for the FIFA World Cup in Brazil.

== See also ==
- List of microphone manufacturers
