= RCA Type 44 =

Ribbon microphone

The RCA Type 44 microphone is a bi-directional ribbon microphone, or pressure-gradient microphone, first introduced by the RCA Corporation in 1931.

== History ==
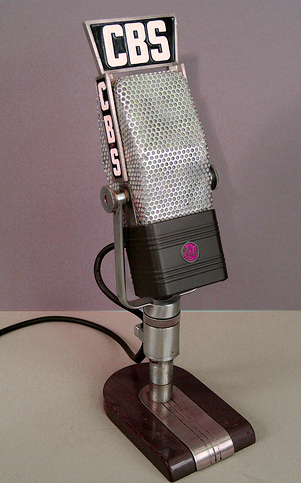
RCA Type 44-BX ribbon microphone from 1940 used by CBS

Dr. Harry F. Olson began working for RCA Laboratories, where he developed ribbon microphones, first with field coils and then with permanent magnets, resulting in the first ribbon microphones with bi-directional pickup pattern, the RCA Photophone PB-17 and PB-31, introduced in 1931. The PB-31 was employed by Radio City Music Hall in 1932.

Also in 1931, RCA introduced the Type 44-A Velocity Microphone. A smaller and lower-priced version of the uni-directional Type 77-A, the 44-A's smooth sound and defined pattern control reduced the effect of reverberation on soundstages and offered higher gain-before-feedback in live sound applications, making it a staple of the audio recording and broadcasting industries.

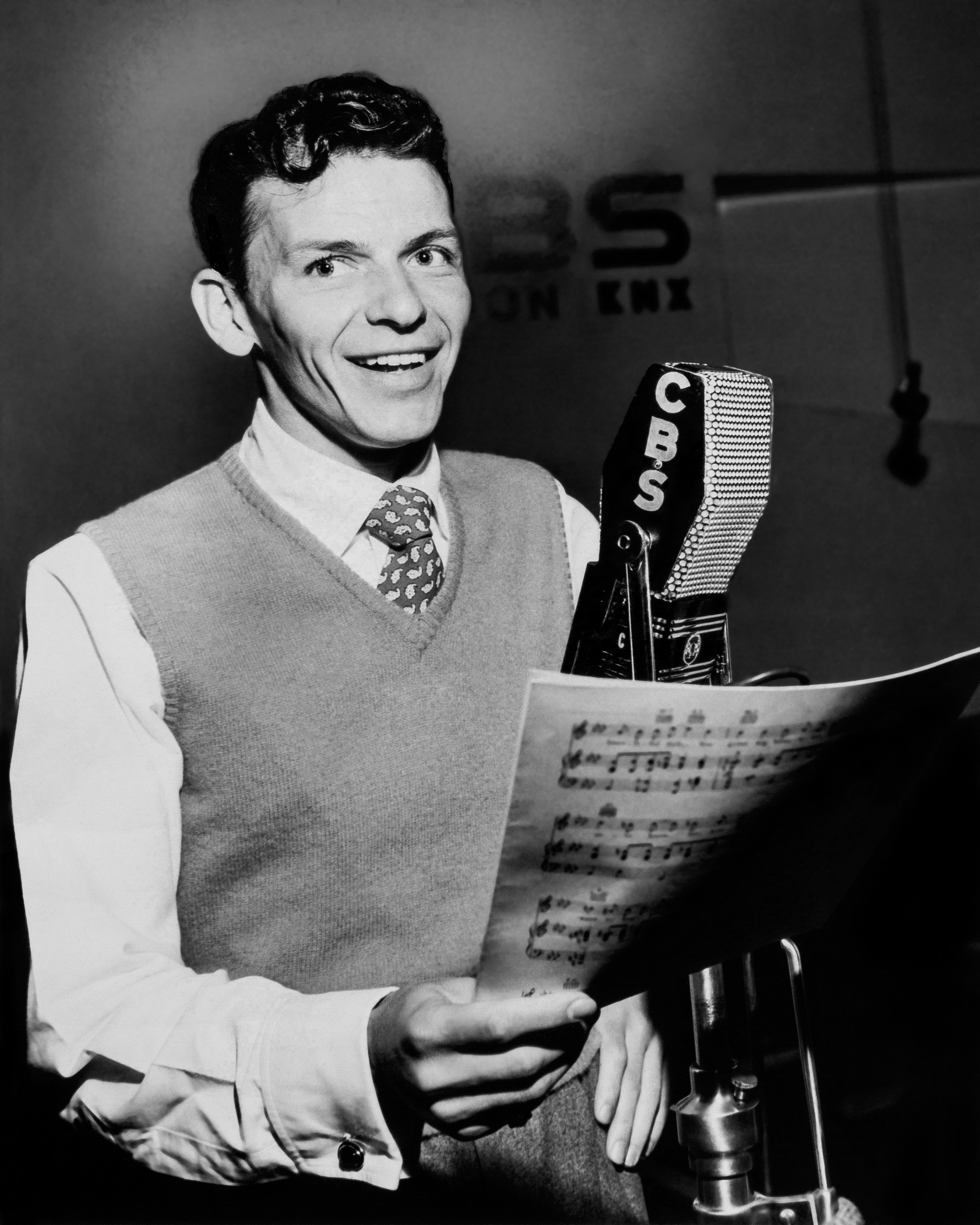
Frank Sinatra with an RCA Type 44 microphone on CBS Radio in 1944

In 1940, RCA updated the Type 44 with improved magnet material to introduce the Type 44-B and Type 44-BX. The 44-B and BX were both a slightly larger version of the 44-A. The 44-BX has the ribbon mounted further towards the back giving it a smaller figure 8 pickup pattern on the rear side. The Type 44-B and BX remained in production until its discontinuation in 1957.The RCA 44 was discontinued in 1957.

The RCA Type 44-BX and Type 77-A ribbon microphones were the most popular microphones for recording in the 1930s and 40s. They were popular not only in broadcasting studios, but also on film studio scoring stages, where they were often used to record string sections. Many of the top American scoring stages still use these ribbon microphones today.

== Diaphragm ==
The diaphragm of the Type 44 and other early RCA ribbon microphones is a very thin (2.5 microns) metal ribbon crimped with 19 pitch 90-degree perpendicular corrugations. This very lightweight ribbon is suspended under very little tension. As the ribbon vibrates, a voltage is induced at right angles to both the ribbon velocity and magnetic field direction and is picked off by contacts at the ends of the ribbon.

== Legacy ==
Jon R. Sank joined RCA's acoustical laboratory in 1957, and designed the BK11, a successor to the Type 44. In 1976, RCA exited the ribbon microphone business.

After RCA exited the ribbon microphone business, Wes Dooley and Bob Gerbracht founded Audio Engineering Associates, or AEA, first servicing vintage RCA microphones, then manufacturing replacement parts. In 1998, after recreating and fabricating all of the parts of the original RCA 44 microphone, AEA began manufacturing the R44C using RCA's original methods, including tools given to Dooley by Jon Sank at RCA. AEA continues to manufacture recreations of classic RCA designs, as well as new updated variations.

In 2005, the RCA Type 44-A Velocity Microphone was inducted into the TECnology Hall of Fame.
