= Gauge Precision Instruments =

- Type: Private
- Industry: Professional Audio
- Founded: 2008
- Headquarters: Beverly Hills, California
- Key people: Jeffry Piergeorge; Chandler Bridges, Jr.
- Products: Microphones, Audio Accessories
- Website: www.gauge-usa.com

Gauge Precision Instruments (originally Gauge, Inc.) is a U.S.-based designer and importer of audio electronics and accessories for professional and consumer markets. The company was founded by Chandler R. Bridges, Jr. and Robert C. Chiarelli in Beverly Hills, CA in 2008. Gauge Precision Instruments' most prevalent product categories are microphones and audio accessories. In January 2012, the company expanded and opened new offices in Tallahassee, Florida. In early 2017, Chiarelli sold his shares to Jeffrey Piergeorge.

== History ==
In 2007 Chandler Bridges and Rob Chiarelli begin experimentation in loudspeaker and microphone design. In 2008 Gauge Precision Instruments introduces the ECM-87, their first cardioid condenser microphone. Gauge introduced the ECM-47 in 2009, their first multi-pattern Tube microphone. That year Gauge also introduced the USB-87, a Universal Serial Bus powered microphone designed specifically for use with the personal computer, and the ECM-84 and ECM-84SE, their first small diaphragm electret condenser microphone. In 2010, the company introduced the ECM-58, their first hand-held dynamic microphone. The ECM58 was discontinued in April, 2012 and the company introduced the ECM87 Stealth Microphone, an alternate version of the ECM87 Classic. In 2013, the company introduced the MP-1073, their first microphone preamplifier.

== Microphones ==
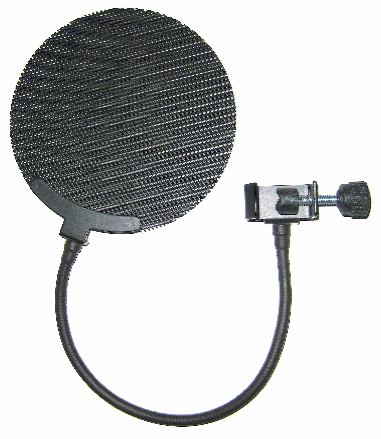
A Gauge, Inc. pop filter

Gauge microphones were first introduced at the TAXI Music Convention in 2009 in Los Angeles, CA and later gained notoriety with recording artists Miriam Grey, Miranda Cosgrove, Kanye West, Usher, Kelly Clarkson, Club Nouveau and during the 2009 American Music Awards telecast. They have also been used by NBC, Nickelodeon, Sony and Warner Brothers television networks and in recordings by notable arrangers Paul Buckmaster and Benjamin Wright.

Among its professional products, especially noteworthy is the ECM-87 (introduced in 2008) and its successors and alternate versions, which include the ECM-87A, the ECM-87 Stealth, the ECM-47, the ECM-84 and the ECM-84SP. Many personal and professional recording studios use the Gauge ECM-87, ECM-47, ECM-58 and ECM-84 microphones as a solution for general use in a variety of musical styles, voice-over and narration.

=== Design ===
The original ECM-87 microphone design is based on conventional microphone circuitry and design with various proprietary modifications to the capsule and components. The Gauge ECM-47 is a multi-pattern vacuum tube microphone which utilizes the 6072 low-noise vacuum tube. Gauge has a unique quality control process that employs multi-platinum audio engineers to hand select their microphones.

=== Current models ===
| Microphones | Notes |
|---|---|
| ECM-87S | Introduced in 2012, can be easily identified by the color of the sleeve and wide mesh screen. |
| ECM-87 | Introduced in 2008, can be identified by the serial number on the capsule housing. |
| ECM-87A | Can be identified by various components on the circuit board. |
| ECM-47 | Introduced in 2009, a multi-pattern Tube microphone. |
| ECM-84 | Introduced in 2009, a small diaphragm electret condenser microphone. |
| USB-87 | Introduced in 2009, cardioid condenser microphone which operates on power supplied by the USB on Personal computers. |
| ECM-58 | Introduced in 2010, a hand-held dynamic microphone. Discontinued. |
| ECM84 Kit | Introduced in 2013, a small diaphragm stereo electret condenser microphone kit. |
| MP-1073 | Introduced in 2013, a Class-A microphone preamplifier |
| ECM84 Pro | Introduced in 2016, a small diaphragm stereo electret condenser microphone kit. |

== Accessories ==
- Pop filters
- Audio Cables
- Microphone Shock Mount

== See also ==
- List of microphone manufacturers
