= Lautens =

Lautens is a surname. Notable people with the surname include:

- Gary Lautens (1928–1992), Canadian humorist and newspaper columnist
- Mark Lautens (born 1959), Canadian organic chemist

== See also ==
- Lauten
