= American D-22 and D-33 microphones =

Dynamic microphones

The American D-22 and American D-33 microphones are dual-impedance, omnidirectional, dynamic microphones made by the American Microphone Company. They were used extensively in the broadcast industry in the 1950s because of their modern sleek looks and tapered waist design.

== Background ==
The D-22 and D-33 were introduced as part of the full-vision (FV) series of microphones in the early 1950s. Their major innovation was their slim profile. Other microphones were typically large and bulky. This blocked the view of the presenter on TV.

The sleek design was achieved with a precision-machined "Duraluminum" case with a two-tone color scheme.

The D-22 and D-33 featured a micro-metal alloy diaphragms which was unaffected by temperature changes. The diaphragm also had an anti-corrosion treatment to protect it from air-borne contamination from the presenter's voice.

The D-22 and D-33 were dual-impedance microphones with the high or low impedance selected using an innovative "linkage bar" under the name plate and a unique "slide-lock" microphone stand mount.

== Specifications ==
Type
dynamic micro-metal alloy diaphragm
D-22 frequency response
100 Hz to 8 kHz (+/− 5 dB)
D-33 frequency response
40 Hz to 15 kHz (+/− 2.5 dB)
Polar pattern
omnidirectional
Connector
three-pin professional audio connector (male XLR type)
Sensitivity
low impedance: −86 dB
High impedance: −52 dB
Impedance
Switchable 50 ohms or 40K ohms
Produced
1950s–60s
Size
8.2 × 1 inch
List price (1961)
$99.50
