= Raymond A. Litke =

Raymond A. Litke (1920-1986) was an American electronic engineer, the inventor of a practical wireless microphone, and the first to patent the wireless microphone. He was born and raised on a farm near Alma, Kansas, but spent most of his adult life in San Jose, California.

== Wireless microphone ==
Litke invented a wireless microphone in 1957 while employed as an electronics expert at San Jose State College. His supervisor challenged him to invent a microphone to use in educational presentations which would be free of wires.

Litke’s wireless mike resembled a silver tube with “a microphone at the top, a transmitter in the middle and its battery power supply at the bottom.” It was 6 inches long, 1 inch in diameter, and weighed 7 ounces; the device had a broadcast range of up to a half-mile. Two types of mikes were available: lavalier and hand-held. A companion receiver, weighing 17 pounds, completed the portable sound system.

Although Litke prototyped the wireless microphone in 1957, he did not file for a patent until May 8, 1961. U.S. Patent No. 3,134,074 was officially granted on May 19, 1964. His microphone is sometimes also called the “Vega-Mike” after the Vega Electronics Corporation which first manufactured it as a product. Vega sold other electronics items and tapes developed by Litke.

Litke's wireless microphone was first tested at the Olympic trials held at Stanford University in 1959. Next, the American Broadcasting Company (ABC television) tested the microphone at the Democratic and Republican Conventions in 1960. Candidates John F. Kennedy and Richard Nixon were among the first celebrities to use the Vega-Mike. TV anchor John Daly praised Litke's invention on the ABC television news broadcast in July 1960. Daly introduced it to Americans with the words: "This is a Vega-Mike" and went on to explain it "is a wireless microphone, six inches long... without any wires of any kind...." Daly pointed out it could be used to broadcast "within the (convention) hall or outside... without the inconvenience of interconnecting microphone cables...." Even the Federal Communications Commission was impressed with it. The FCC gave him 12 frequencies instead of the one he was seeking.

== Other accomplishments ==
In the 1960s Litke worked at the University of California, San Francisco Medical Center as the chief engineer of Educational Television and as an electronics expert. By 1961 he had worked for the University of California system for ten years.
