= Coles 4038 =

Ribbon microphone

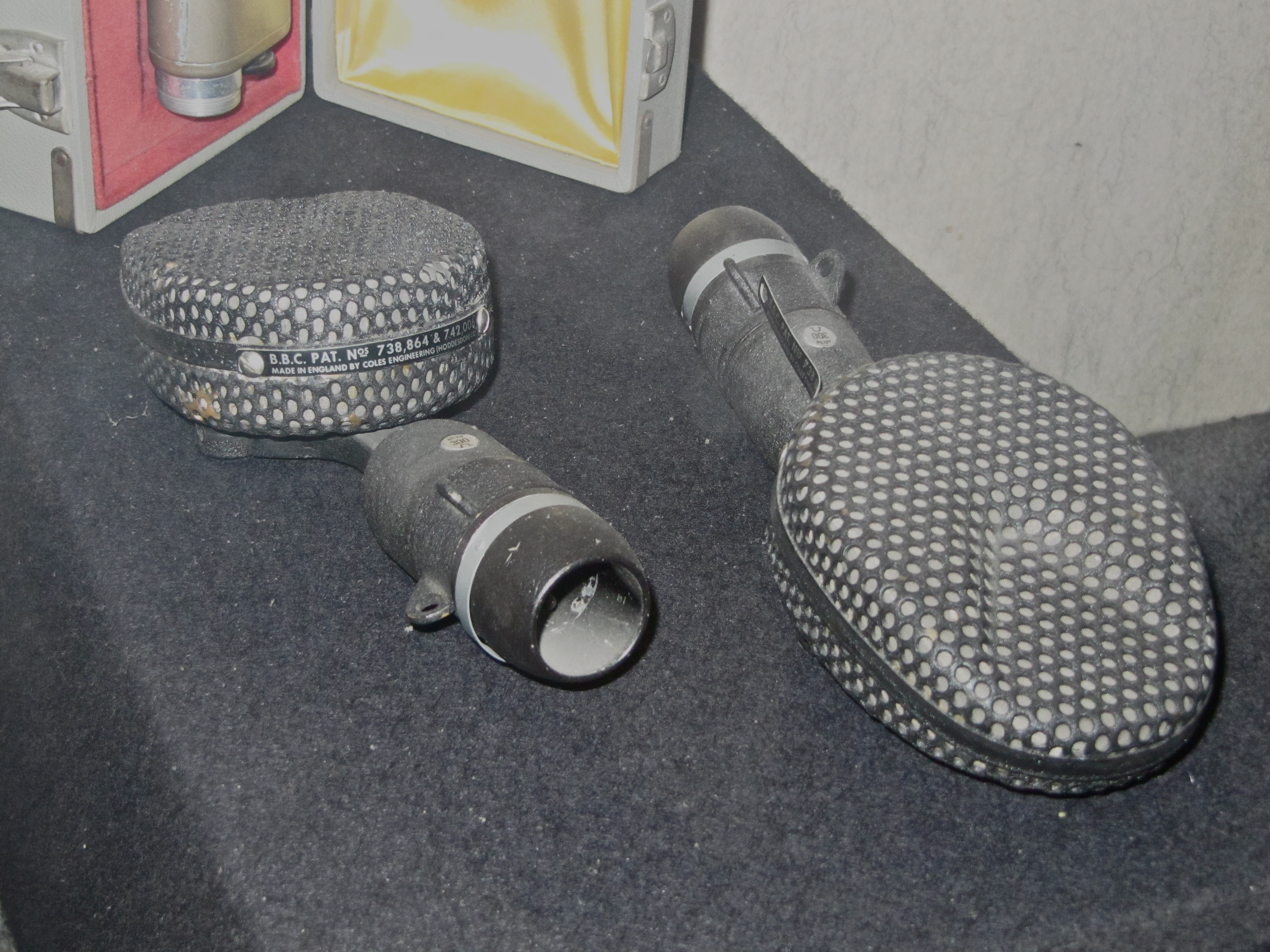
Two Coles 4038 microphones on display at the Beatles Story

The Coles 4038 is a ribbon microphone produced by Coles Electroacoustics. The microphone was designed and patented by the BBC in the 1950s and was originally known as the STC 4038. The sound of the microphone has been described as "British" with a "BBC politeness", and its appearance has been likened to that of a waffle iron. It is used in both sound recording and radio broadcasting.

== History ==
The microphone was designed by the BBC in 1953 and the prototype was assigned the model number BBC PGS/1. It was designed as a result of the BBC's request for a strong and affordable microphone that was smaller than previous models (such as the Type A). The 4038 was an improvement on the Type A's frequency response, and was described as "less obtrusive".

The microphone was produced by Standard Telephones and Cables before their manufacturing was transferred to Coles in the mid-1970s. Since its design in the 1950s, the technical specifications of the 4038 have remained unchanged.

== Use ==
=== Recording ===
In recording environments, the 4038 is often used as drum overheads and on brass instruments. The microphone became a favourite of British recording engineers in the 1950s and 60s, but did not receive widespread use in the United States. The microphone was described as recording sounds "bigger than life" – such as drums or amplified guitars – some Beatles and Led Zeppelin recordings featured 4038s as overhead microphones on the drum kit.

In a 1994 interview, Steve Albini said that "if [he] owned one mic, this would be it". Albini has also commented that "really nothing beats them as an overhead on a drum kit".

=== Broadcast ===
At one point, Bush House, the former home of the BBC World Service, used the 4038 almost exclusively.

== Technical ==
The 4038's frequency response is flat, with a range of approximately 30–15,000 Hz. The attenuation of high frequencies reduces sibilance on vocals, but also reduces detail.

The microphone uses a bi-directional polar pattern.

The microphone is connected using a Western Electric jack connector designated 4069, which adapts the microphone's three-pin output to a standard XLR connector.

Sensitivity
-65 dB ref: 1 volt/Pa (open-circuit voltage at 1,000 Hz)
Impedance
300 ohms
Produced
1950s–present

== Sources ==
- Coles (2002a), 4038 Studio Ribbon Microphone, Hoddesdon, Hertfordshire: Coles Electroacoustics Ltd., archived from the original on 8 July 2011
- Coles (2002b), 4038 Studio Ribbon Microphone Technical Specification, Hoddesdon, Hertfordshire: Coles Electroacoustics Ltd., archived from the original on 4 March 2011
- Coutant, Stan (2009), STC Brochures, Drums, PA: Coutant.org
- Cotton, Jon (2007), Ribbon Mics On Test, Cambridge, Cambridgeshire: Sound on Sound
- Dooley, Wes (2006), Coles 4038 Studio Ribbon Microphone (PDF), Pasadena, CA: Audio Engineering Associates, archived from the original (PDF) on 28 September 2011
- Electronic musician (2005), Electronic Musician, vol. 21, New York, NY: Penton Media
- Fuston, Lynn (2008), "Coles Electroacoustics 4038", EQ Magazine, Recording Hacks
- Hi-Fi News (1997), Issues 1-6, vol. 42, Poole, Dorset: Link House Publications
- Institution of Electrical Engineers (1961), The Proceedings of the Institution of Electrical Engineers Part 2, vol. 108, London: The Institution
- Leonard, John A (2001), Theatre Sound, Abingdon, Oxfordshire: Routledge, ISBN 0-87830-116-X
- Owsinski, Bobby (2004), The Recording Engineer's Handbook, Milwaukee, WI: Hal Leonard, ISBN 1-932929-00-2
- Schultz, Barbara (2000), Music Producers: Conversations with Today's Top Hit Makers, Milwaukee, WI: Hal Leonard, ISBN 0-87288-730-8
- Shaw, Alan A (2008), BBC Monitors 1922-1960, Haywards Heath, West Sussex: Harbeth Loudspeakers, archived from the original on 7 October 2010
- Shechmeister, Matthew (11 January 2011), Relics Reborn: Ribbon Microphones Rally for Vintage-Audio Geeks, San Francisco, California: Wired Magazine
- Standard Telephones and Cables (1961), 4038 Ribbon Microphone (PDF), London: STC
- Streicher, Ron; Dooley, Wes (1997), Coles 4038 Studio Ribbon Microphone User's Guide (PDF), Pasadena, CA: Audio Engineering Associates, archived from the original (PDF) on 28 September 2011
- White, Paul (2010), NI Abbey Road 60s Drums Sample Library, Cambridge, Cambridgeshire: Sound on Sound
