= Erin Boheme =

American jazz singer

- Born: 1986 (age 39–40); Oshkosh, Wisconsin, U.S.
- Genres: Jazz
- Occupation: Singer
- Instrument: Vocals
- Years active: 2004–present
- Labels: Concord, Heads Up

Erin Boheme is an American jazz singer.

== Life and career ==
Boheme was born in Oshkosh, Wisconsin in 1986. When she was fifteen, she and her mother went to Los Angeles to look for a record deal. They returned to Wisconsin unsuccessful. In 2004 Mike Melvoin, a native of Oshkosh, was nominated for a Grammy Award, and Boheme sent her congratulations. Melvoin asked her to work on his records, and he became a mentor. When she was eighteen, she was offered a contract by Concord Records, which released her debut album, What Love Is, in 2006. Her second album, What a Life, was produced by Michael Bublé.

In 2017, Boheme sang at the inauguration of President Donald Trump.

== Discography ==
- What Love Is (Concord, 2006)
- What a Life (Heads Up, 2013)
