= MIPRO =

Taiwanese audio equipment manufacturer

MIPRO Electronics Co., Ltd. 嘉強電子股份有限公司
- Company type: Private
- Industry: Audio electronics
- Founded: Taiwan (1995)
- Headquarters: Chiayi, Taiwan
- Key people: K.C Chang, founder MIPRO, CEO
- Products: Wireless microphone systems, and portable wireless PA Systems
- Number of employees: 200
- Website: http://www.mipro.com.tw/

MIPRO Electronics Co., Ltd. (Chinese: 嘉強電子), established in 1995, is an ISO-9001 certified Taiwan-based company that designs and manufactures wireless microphones, portable wireless public address (PA) and other wireless audio equipment for consumer, professional and commercial applications. U.S. President Barack Obama used a MIPRO wireless microphone system during his election campaign in 2008.

In 2001, MIPRO developed and patented an Automatic Channel Targeting (ACT) technology. "ACT" provides automatic synchronization of receiver and transmitter frequencies, commonly known as "sync". The ACT function is an intelligent wireless system channel set-up feature.

Gary Kayye, CTS, founder of Kayye Consulting and rAVe Publications stated MIPRO as one of My Top 6 New Companies to Watch—From InfoComm 2008

MIPRO MA-909 wireless system was nominated for Outstanding Technical Achievement in Wireless Technology in the 2006 TEC Awards.

MIPRO ACT-82 wireless system was nominated for Outstanding Technical Achievement in Wireless Technology in the 2007 TEC Awards.

MIPRO ACT-51 wireless system was nominated for Outstanding Technical Achievement in Wireless Technology in the 2008 TEC Awards.

MIPRO ACT-727 wireless system was nominated for Outstanding Technical Achievement in Wireless Technology in the 2009 TEC Awards.

== History ==
MIPRO was established in 1995 by founder K.C. Chang, who had in 1970 designed the first FM wireless microphone in Taiwan and obtained the first patent for a condenser microphone capsule in Taiwan.

In 2001 MIPRO introduced a technology they termed ACT (Automatic Channel Targeting). "ACT" synchronizes the receiver and transmitter frequencies. This was followed in 2006 by MIPRO introducing the first encrypted digital wireless microphone system and later, digital wireless tour guide & language interpretation Systems in Taiwan.

== The Company ==
The brand name "MIPRO" stands for "MI"crophone "PRO"fessionals. It is headquartered in Chiayi, Taiwan, with 200 employees and sales offices in China, Hong Kong, Germany, Korea and Austria. MIPRO designs and manufactures professional digital and analog wireless microphones, wireless portable PA systems, wireless in-ear monitoring, tour-guide and portable wireless ENG receivers and other wireless audio systems.

== Automatic Channel Targeting ==
MIPRO developed and patented an Automatic Channel Targeting technology (ACT) in 2001. The "ACT" synchronizes (syncs) the receiver and transmitter frequencies automatically with a touch of a button. The ACT function has become the industry-standard for multi-channel wireless systems set-up.

== See also ==
- List of companies of Taiwan
- List of microphone manufacturers
- Microphone and wireless microphone
