= Core Sound LLC =

American audio equipment manufacturer

Core Sound LLC is an audio equipment manufacturer of microphones and audio electronics, primarily addressing portable recording and microphones designed using psychoacoustic principles. Founded in 1989, it is a manufacturer of binaural microphones for binaural recording. It also manufactures an Ambisonics first-order, and second-order soundfield microphone used for virtual reality surround sound recording.

== Awards ==
- In November 2006, Core Sound was one of 38 recipients of Pro Audio Review's PAR Excellence Award.

== See also ==
- List of microphone manufacturers
