= American Microphone =

Microphone manufacturer and dealer

American Microphone Company
- Company type: Defunct
- Industry: Professional audio electronics
- Founder: Fern Yarbrough
- Headquarters: Los Angeles, United States
- Products: Microphones

American Microphone Company was an American microphone manufacturer and dealer. They manufactured several microphone models, and marketed used and military communication mics. The company shut down in the mid 1980s.

== History ==
Fern A. Yarbrough founded the American Microphone Company in Los Angeles in the 1930s. The company supplied microphones for broadcast, recording, and live sound. The broadcast and film industries used the American D-22 and D-33 Microphones extensively, in part because of their modern sleek looks and tapered design.

In 1955, the Elgin Watch Company bought American Microphone. Elgin wanted to develop miniature components for microphones, but eventually abandoned the plan. Around 1960, Elgin Watch Company sold American Microphone to General Cement Company of Rockford, IL (AKA G.C. Electronics). Several years later, Electro-Voice bought American Microphone—and soon retired the brand.

== Products ==
Full-Vision (FV) Series:

- D-22 hand-held microphone
- D-33 extended frequency response hand-held microphone
