= RCA Type 77-A microphone =

Ribbon microphone

The RCA Type 77-A microphone was a simplex (uni-directional) ribbon microphone, the forerunner of the RCA Type 77-DX microphone. The 77-A was designed Dr. Harry F. Olson in the late 1920s or early 1930s; prototypes are rumored to have existed in 1929 and 1930, but the 77-A was not announced until 1932.

The 77-A would set the standard for all other RCA ribbon microphone comparisons for the next 40 years.

== Construction ==
It featured a spiral acoustic labyrinth inside the case and two vertical in-line ribbons which enabled it to be uni-directional.
