= Harry F. Olson =

American engineer and inventor (1901–1982)

Harry Ferdinand Olson (December 28, 1901 – April 1, 1982) was an American engineer and inventor with RCA Victor, the Acoustic Research Director of RCA Laboratories, Princeton, and a pioneer in the field of 20th century acoustical engineering notably in the fields of high-fidelity, digital music synthesis, microphones, loudspeakers, acoustics, radar, submarine communication, magnetic tape and noise reduction.

Olson wrote ten books including Dynamical Analogies, on electrical-mechanical-acoustical analogies, and had over one hundred patents.

== Biography ==
Harry F. Olson was born in Mount Pleasant, Iowa, to Swedish immigrant parents. Technically inclined from an early age, he built and flew model airplanes, constructed a steam engine and invented a wood-fired boiler that drove a 100-volt DC generator. Olson designed and built an amateur radio transmitter, gaining enough proficiency to be granted an operator's license. Olson went on to earn a bachelor's degree in electrical engineering from the University of Iowa then continued to earn a master's degree with a thesis on acoustic wave filters in solids and a doctorate in physics, working with polarization of resonance radiation in mercury.

Immediately after completing his course of study in 1928, Olson moved to New Jersey to work for RCA Laboratories. Olson would remain at RCA for almost four decades.

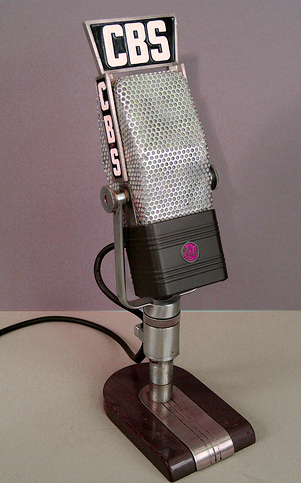
An RCA 44-series ribbon microphone that was used by CBS. In 2005, Mix Foundation honored Harry F. Olson and Les Anderson of RCA with induction to the TECnology Hall of Fame for their development of the Model 44 microphone in 1931.

Olson had a continuing interest in music, acoustics, and sound reproduction, and, by 1934, he was placed in charge of acoustical research at RCA. At RCA, Olson worked on a wide range of projects, which included developing microphones for the broadcasting and motion picture industries, improving loudspeakers, and making significant contributions to magnetic tape recording.

Like many engineers of the World War II generation, Olson also made significant contributions to military technology as well, particularly to the fields of underwater sound and anti-submarine warfare.

After the war Olson, along with Herbert Belar, developed the first modern electronic synthesizer. Equipped with electron tubes, the Mark II Sound Synthesizer was used to compose music, which was recorded and sold to the public.

A prolific inventor and engineer, Olson was awarded more than 100 patents for the various types of microphones (including the widely used 44- and 77-series), cardioid (directional) microphones, loudspeaker baffles, air-suspension loudspeakers, isobaric loudspeakers, early video recording equipment, audio recording equipment, phonograph pickups, underwater sound equipment, noise reduction, sound technology in motion-pictures, and public-address systems he developed. He also authored 135 articles and ten books including an interdisciplinary text charting the dynamical analogies between electrical, acoustical and mechanical systems.

In 1949, Olson was honored by being the first recipient of the Audio Engineering Society's John H. Potts Memorial Award, an award program which was later renamed the gold medal. In 1953-4 Olson served as president of the Acoustical Society of America, which awarded him the very first Silver Medal in Engineering Acoustics in 1974 and the Gold Medal in 1981. He won the IEEE Lamme Medal in 1970, was elected to the National Academy of Sciences in 1959, and was the recipient of many honorary degrees during his lifetime.

Olson retired from RCA in 1967, continuing as a consultant for RCA Laboratories.

== High Fidelity Demonstration ==
Shortly after World War II, Dr. Olson conducted an experiment, now considered a classic, to determine the preferred bandwidth for the reproduction of music. Previous experimenters had found that listeners seemed to prefer a high-frequency cutoff of 5000 Hz for reproduced music. Dr. Olson suspected that this was likely due to imperfections in the sound, especially in the higher frequencies, as reproduced by equipment in common use at the time. These imperfections included clicks and pops (from 78 rpm recordings), added noise (from AM radio broadcast static), hiss and harmonic distortion (from amplifier circuits), and non linear frequency response from primitive loudspeaker designs. If the sound was free of these problems, he reasoned, listeners would prefer full frequency reproduction.

In his experiment, he set up a room which was divided diagonally by a visually opaque but acoustically transparent screen. The screen incorporated a concealed low-pass acoustical filter having an upper frequency cutoff of 5000 Hz. This filter could be opened or closed, allowing either the full range of frequencies to pass or the range only below 5000 Hz. At first, a small orchestra sat and performed on one side of the screen, while a group of test subjects sat on the other and listened. The listeners were asked to select their preference between two conditions: full bandwidth or restricted bandwidth. There was overwhelming preference in favor of the full bandwidth. Next, the orchestra was replaced with a sound-reproduction system with loudspeakers positioned behind the screen instead. When the sound system was free of distortion, the listeners preferred the full bandwidth. But when he introduced small amounts of nonlinear distortion, the subjects preferred a restricted bandwidth, thus demonstrating clearly the importance of high quality in audio systems.

As a result of this experiment and the work of others, such as Avery Fisher and later Edgar Villchur, high fidelity sound recording, transmission, and reproduction equipment saw increased investment, development, and public acceptance in the following decades. The design and manufacture of everything from microphones, to tape recorders, vinyl records, amplifiers, and loudspeakers were impacted.

== Influence on High-Quality Modern PA Systems ==
The Grateful Dead's early sound engineering team, led by Owsley Stanley and Dan Healy, considered Harry Olson's 1957 book "Acoustical Engineering" the Dead's "bible" on building the Wall of Sound (Grateful Dead), the first touring sound system that allowed a band to actually hear themselves and have the audience hear what the band was hearing on stage. The band made copies of the book for all of the Dead's sound crew.

The Wall of Sound influenced all modern high-quality PA systems for live music.

== Personal life ==
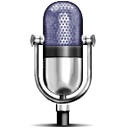
Iconic microphone image based on the design of the RCA Type 77-A microphone

Harry F. Olson was born in Mt. Pleasant, Iowa, on December 18, 1901. He was the first of two children. His parents were Swedish immigrants.

Olson married Lorene Johnson of Morris, Illinois in 1935. Both his mother and his wife were talented amateur artists — Lorene's paintings were displayed in Olson's RCA office for many years. Olson died at Princeton Medical Center in Princeton, New Jersey on April 1, 1982, at the age of 80.

== Awards and honors ==
Year	Honor or Award
1940	The Modern Pioneer Award of the National Association of Manufacturers
1952	The John H. Potts Medal of the Audio Engineering Society
1955	The Samuel L. Warner Medal of the Society of Motion Picture and Television Engineers
1956	The John Scott Medal of the City of Philadelphia
1956	The Achievement Award of the IRE Professional Group on Audio
1963	The John Ericsson Medal of the American Society of Swedish Engineers
1965	The Emile Berliner Award of the Audio Engineering Society
1967	The Institute of Electrical and Electronics Engineers' Mervin J. Kelly Medal
1969	The Institute of Electrical and Electronics Engineers' Consumer Electronics Award
1970	The Institute of Electrical and Electronics Engineers' Lamme Medal
1974	The Acoustical Society of America's first silver medal in engineering acoustics
1981	The Acoustical Society of America's Gold Medal

== Patents ==
Year	Patent Description	Patent Number
1931	Acoustic Device For Sound Pick-up (Ellipsoid Microphone)	1,814,357
1932	Apparatus for Converting Sound Vibrations Into Electrical Variations (First Practical Ribbon Microphone)	1,885,001
1932	System Responsive to The Energy Flow of Sound Waves (Pressure and Velocity Sound Level Meter)	1,892,644
1932	Sound Pick-Up Device (Unidirectional Cardioid Microphone)	1,892,645
1933	System For the Conversion and Transfer Of Energy (Condenser Microphone Step-Up Transformer With A Remote Preamplifier.)	1,897,732
1934	Acoustic Device (Loudspeaker Horn)	1,984,542
1935	Loud Speaker and Method of Propagating Sound (Passive Radiator Loud Speaker)	1,988,250
1935	Acoustic Device (Double Voice Coil Loudspeaker)	2,007,748
1936	Electroacoustical Device (Ribbon Telephone Microphone/Speaker)	2,064,316
1937	Sound Reproducing Apparatus (Multi-Cellular Horn)	2,102,212
1937	Acoustical Device (Small Portable Closed Back Ribbon Microphone)	2,102,736
1938	Microphone	2,113,219
1938	Microphone And Circuit (Microphone Mixer By Verifying Field Coil Strength)	2,119,345
1940	Loud-Speaker (Multiple Flare Horn)	2,203,875
1940	Loud-Speaker (Hybrid Bass-Horn/Bass-Reflex Design)	2,224,919
1941	Electroacoustical Apparatus (Line Microphone "Shotgun Microphone")	2,228,886
1941	Acoustical Apparatus (Woofer Surround)	2,234,007
1942	Signal Translating Apparatus (Multiple Co-Axial Loudspeaker Designs)	2,269,284
1942	Electroacoustical Apparatus (Design of the RCA 77 Ribbon Microphone)	2,271,988
1942	Radio Remote Control System (Using Different Frequencies of Sound)	2,293,166
1942	Electroacoustical Apparatus (Line Array Microphone)	2,299,342
1945	Signal Translating Apparatus (Sub-Aqueous Submarine Microphone)	2,390,847
1947	Magnetostrictive Signal Translating Apparatus (Rugged Sub-Aqueous Submarine Microphone)	2,414,699
1947	Signal Translating Apparatus (Sub-Aqueous Submarine Pressure Compensated Speaker)	2,429,104
1949	Signal Transmission and Receiving Apparatus (Ultrasonically Power Wireless Earphone)	2,461,344
1949	Air Suspension Loudspeaker	2,490,466
1950	Synthetic Reverberation System	2,493,638
1950	Diffraction Type Sound Absorber (Suspended)	2,502,016
1950	Diffraction Type Sound Absorber Covered By A Membrane	2,502,018
1950	Diffraction Type Sound Absorber With Complementary Fitting Portions	2,502,019
1950	Diffraction Type Sound Absorber With Fiberglass Walls (Cylinder)	2,502,019
1950	Single Element, Unidirectional, Dynamic Microphone (With Pattern Control)	2,512,467
1950	Feedback Controller System For Recording Cutters And the Like (Phonograph Recording Lathe)	2,516,338
1951	Directional Microphone (Coincident Pair Of Ribbon Microphones With Horizontal Pattern Control)	2,539,671
1951	Coaxial Dual-Unit Electrodynamic Loud-Speaker (Improved Version)	2,539,672
1951	Transformerless Audio Output System (Tube Amplifier)	2,548,235
1951	Means For Improving The Sensitivity And The Response Characteristics; Of Velocity Microphones	2.566,039
1951	Line Type Pressure Responsive Microphone	2566,094
1951	Velocity Type Microphone (Acoustic High Frequency Equalizer	2,572,376
1953	Suspension System For Dynamic Microphones	2,628,289
1953	Distortion Analyzing Apparatus (Improvement)	2,629,000
1953	Second Order Gradient Directional Microphone	2,640,110
1953	Portable Radio With A Bass-Reflex Cabinet	2,642,948
1953	Noise Discrimination System	2,645,648
1953	Cabinet For Sound Translating Apparatus	2,649,164
1953	Multisection Acoustic Filter (Filtering Out Frequencies above 5,000 Hz)	2,656,004
1954	Uniaxial Microphone	2,680,787
1954	Noise Reduction System	2,686,296
1954	Sound Translating Apparatus (Second Speaker Inside The Cabinet)	2,688,373
1954	Coaxial, Dual Unit, Electrodynamic Loud-Speaker (Improved Magnetic Structure)	2,699,472
1955	Velocity Microphone (Improved Magnetic Structure)	2,699,474
1955	Dynamic Microphone (Compact Design)	2,718,272
1956	Unidirectional Microphone (Low Cost Ribbon Design)	2,751,441
1956	Acoustical Resistance For Pressure Type Microphones	2,773,130
1957	Methods Of Restoring Phonograph Records (Re-synthesizing The Recording)	2,808,466
1957	Transducer With Fluid Filled Diaphragm Suspension	2,814,353
1957	Loudspeaker Structure (Sculpted Cone For High Frequency Pattern Control)	2,825,823
1958	Combination Chassis And Loudspeaker	2,838,607
1958	Directional Microphone (Using Two Microphones To Increase Directivity)	2,854,511
1958	Noise Discriminator, Threshold Type	2,645,684
1958	Music Synthesizer (Electronic)	2,855,816
1958	Wide Range Dynamic Phonograph Pickup	2,858,375
1959	Acoustic Apparatus (Improved Acoustic Labyrinth)	2,870,856
1959	Signal Frequency Change Detector	2,918,667
1960	Vibration Control Apparatus	2,964,272
1961	Apparatus For Speech Analysis and Printer Control Mechanisms	2,971,057
1961	Electronic Sound Absorber	2,983,790
1961	Directional Electrostatic Microphone	3,007,012
1961	Music Composing Machine	3,007,362
1963	Stereophonic Loudspeaker	3,104,729
1968	Voiced Sound Fundamental Frequency Detector	3,400,215
