= Lauten Audio =

Lauten Audio, based in northern California, United States, is a designer and manufacturer of microphones and related equipment. Lauten Audio coined the term Multi-voicing™ which is a unique functionality where the sound characteristics of a microphone can be manipulated via switches or knobs to change its timbre without the use of external hardware.

Lauten Audio released their first product the multi-purpose “Horizon Tube Microphone” in October 2006.

- List of microphone manufacturers
