= JZ Microphones =

Latvian audio equipment manufacturer

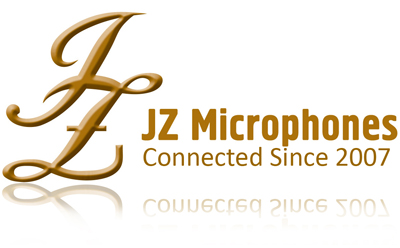
- Industry: Manufacturer, Acoustics
- Founded: 2007; 19 years ago
- Headquarters: Riga, Latvia
- Products: Microphones, Recording Accessories
- Website: www.jzmic.com

JZ Microphones (Juris Zarins Microphones) is a Latvian manufacturer of professional microphones and recording accessories.

== History ==
JZ Microphones was established in 2007 in Riga by jeweler Juris Zarins. After 20 years of repairing Neumann, AKG, Telefunken microphones and participating in Blue and Violet microphones manufacturing he started to produce his own line of microphones.

In 2013, the first product "J1" from the new low-budget microphone series "J" was presented. It gained significant recognition and worldwide recognition, becoming especially popular in China and Russia. This year it was nominated for the 29th TEC Awards in the category "microphone technology for recordings".

== Microphones and accessories ==
JZ Microphones produces ten microphone models, in whose creation twenty-four patents owned by company are used. Most of the microphones are made with ‘’Golden drop’’ technology – a slightly different gilding process of capsule; in result the sound is much natural and cleaner. Also the original design of microphones differ JZ from other microphones, one of the most popular model series Black Hole unique design with hole in body makes attaching easier and also reduces unnecessary sounds.

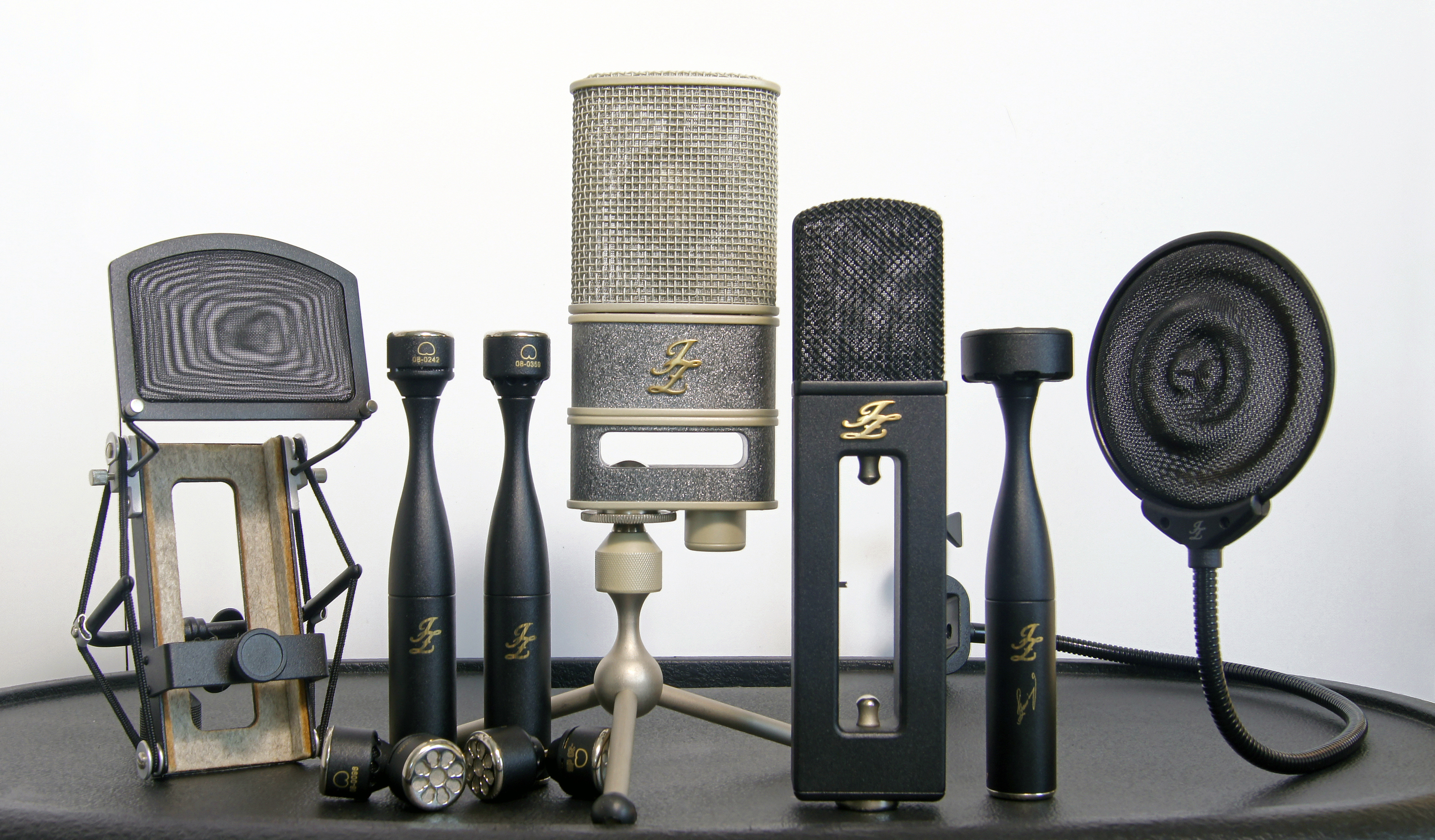
JZ Microphones and Accessories

Sound engineers and producers that use JZ Microphones JZ:

- Andy Gill
- Sylvia Massy
- Dave Jerden
- Kurt Hugo Schneider
- Michael Wagener
- Rafa Sardina
- Bryan Carlstrom
- Rob Chiarelli
- Marc Urselli
- Ignace Rodríguez de R.
