= Wireless microphone =

Microphone without a physical cable

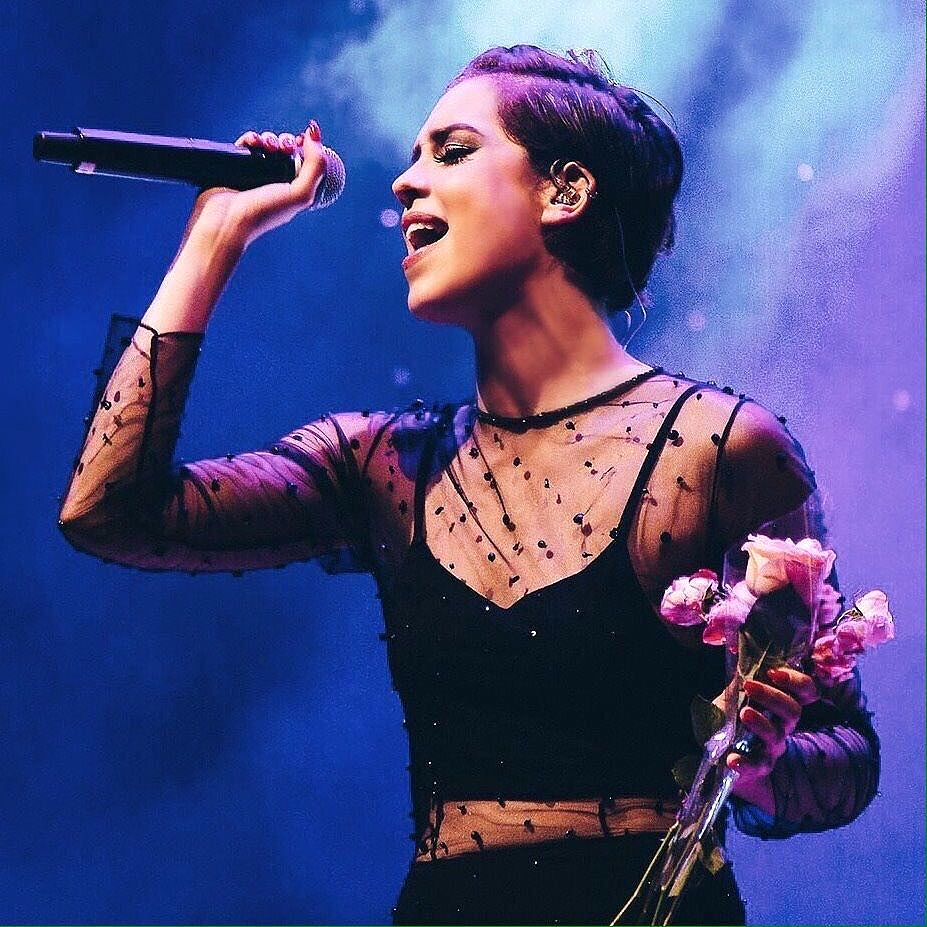
Singer Sophia Abrahão using a handheld wireless microphone

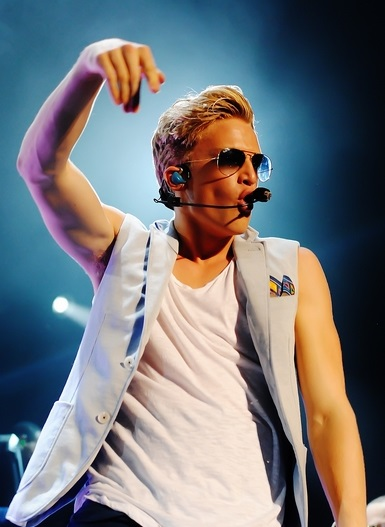
Singer Cody Simpson using a wireless microphone headset in a 2013 concert in Montreal

A wireless microphone, or cordless microphone, is a microphone without a physical cable connecting it directly to the sound recording or amplifying equipment with which it is associated. Also known as a radio microphone, it has a small, battery-powered radio transmitter in the microphone body, which transmits the audio signal from the microphone by radio waves to a nearby receiver unit, which recovers the audio. The other audio equipment is connected to the receiver unit by cable. In one type, the transmitter is contained within the handheld microphone body. In another type, the transmitter is contained within a separate unit called a "bodypack", usually clipped to the user's belt or concealed under their clothes. The bodypack is connected by wire to a "lavalier microphone" or "lav" (a small microphone clipped to the user's lapel), a headset or earset microphone, or another wired microphone. Most bodypack designs also support a wired instrument connection (e.g., to a guitar). Wireless microphones are widely used in the entertainment industry, television broadcasting, and public speaking to allow public speakers, interviewers, performers, and entertainers to move about freely while using a microphone without requiring a cable attached to the microphone.

Wireless microphones usually use the VHF or UHF radio frequency bands since they allow the transmitter to use a small, unobtrusive antenna. Cheap units use a fixed frequency, but most units allow a choice of several frequency channels, in case of interference on a channel or to allow the use of multiple microphones at the same time. Frequency modulation is usually used, although some models use digital modulation to prevent unauthorized reception by scanner radio receivers; these operate in the 900 MHz, 2.4 GHz or 6 GHz ISM bands. Some models use antenna diversity (two antennas) to prevent nulls from interrupting transmission as the performer moves around. A few low-cost (or specialist) models use infrared light, although these require a direct line of sight between microphone and receiver.

== History ==
Various individuals and organizations claim to be the inventors of the wireless microphone.

From about 1945 there were schematics and hobbyist kits offered in Popular Science and Popular Mechanics for making a wireless microphone that would transmit the voice to a nearby radio.

Figure skater and Royal Air Force flight engineer Reg Moores developed a radio microphone in 1947 that he first used in the Tom Arnold production "Aladdin on Ice" at Brighton's sports stadium from September 1949 through the Christmas season. Moores affixed the wireless transmitter to the costume of the character Abanazar, and it worked perfectly. Moores did not patent his idea, as he was illegally using the radio frequency 76 MHz. The producers of the ice show decided that they would not continue using the device; they would rather hire actors and singers to perform into hidden microphones to "dub" the voices of the other ice skaters, who would thus be free to concentrate on their skating. In 1972 Moores donated his 1947 prototype to the Science Museum in London.

Herbert "Mac" McClelland, founder of McClelland Sound in Wichita, Kansas, fabricated a wireless microphone to be worn by baseball umpires at major league games broadcast by NBC from Lawrence–Dumont Stadium in 1951. The transmitter was strapped to the umpire's back. Mac's brother was Harold M. McClelland, the chief communications architect of the U.S. Air Force.

Shure Brothers claims that its Vagabond 88 system from 1953 was "the first handheld wireless microphone system for performers." Its transmitter used five subminiature vacuum tubes and could cover an area from 500 to 5,000 square feet (46 to 465 m^{2}) (a line-of-sight distance of 15 to 40 feet (4.6 to 12.2 m) from the receiver, depending on local electromagnetic interference), using FM at a carrier frequency of 2.1 MHz. At about the same time, Donald E. Thomas at Bell Labs described an experimental transmitter that used a single point-contact transistor as both oscillator and modulator and whose signal could be picked up by any commercial FM receiver.

In 1957, the German audio equipment manufacturer Sennheiser, at that time called Lab W, working with the German broadcaster Norddeutscher Rundfunk (NDR), exhibited a wireless microphone system. From 1958 the system was marketed through Telefunken under the name of Mikroport. The pocket-sized Mikroport incorporated a dynamic moving-coil cartridge microphone with a cardioid pickup pattern. It transmitted at 37 MHz with a specified range of 300 feet (90 m).

The first recorded patent for a wireless microphone was filed by Raymond A. Litke, an American electrical engineer with Educational Media Resources and San Jose State College, who invented a wireless microphone in 1957 to meet the multimedia needs for television, radio, and classroom instruction. The main transmitter module was a cigar-sized device that weighed 7 ounces (200 g), contained the microphone and circuitry including four junction transistors (a two-transistor audio amplifier, a one-transistor oscillator/modulator similar to the one described by Thomas, and a final RF amplifier), and was suspended around the user's neck in lavalier fashion by a cord that also carried the antenna wire. Vega Electronics Corporation manufactured the design in 1959, producing it as a product called the Vega-Mike. The device was used by the broadcast media at the 1960 Democratic and Republican National Conventions. It allowed television reporters to roam the floor of the convention to interview participants, including presidential candidates John F. Kennedy and Richard Nixon. Litke's patent was granted in May 1964, assigned to Vega Electronics.

Introduced in 1958, the Sony CR-4 wireless microphone was being recommended as early as 1960 for theater performances and nightclub acts. Animal trainers at Marineland of the Pacific in California were wearing the $250 device for performances in 1961. The 27.12 MHz solid-state FM transmitter was capable of fitting into a shirt pocket. Said to be effective out to 100 feet (30 m), it mounted a flexible dangling antenna and a detachable dynamic microphone. The tube-based receiver incorporated a carrying drawer for the transmitter and a small monitor loudspeaker with volume control.

Another German equipment manufacturer, Beyerdynamic, claims that its Transistophone, which went into production in 1962, was the first wireless microphone.

The first time that a wireless microphone was used to record sound during filming of a motion picture was allegedly on Rex Harrison in the 1964 film My Fair Lady, through the efforts of Academy Award-winning Hollywood sound engineer George Groves.

By 1971, wireless microphone products for amateurs and hobbyists were available. Radio Shack offered a microphone/transmitter module that proved to be vulnerable to capacitive detuning as a user moved around and mingled with crowds. One solution was to build on a final RF amplifier stage, which the module lacked, though Litke had already anticipated the problem and included one in his patent.

Wider dynamic range came with the introduction of the first compander wireless microphone, offered by Nady Systems in 1976. Todd Rundgren and the Rolling Stones were the first popular musicians to use these systems live in concert. Kate Bush is regarded as the first artist to have had a headset with a wireless microphone built for use in music. For her Tour of Life in 1979 she had a compact microphone combined with a self-made construction of wire clothes hangers, to free her hands for expressionist dance performances. Her idea was adopted for live performance by other artists such as Madonna and Peter Gabriel.

Nady joined CBS, Sennheiser and Vega in 1996 to receive a joint Emmy Award for "pioneering [the] development of the broadcast wireless microphone".

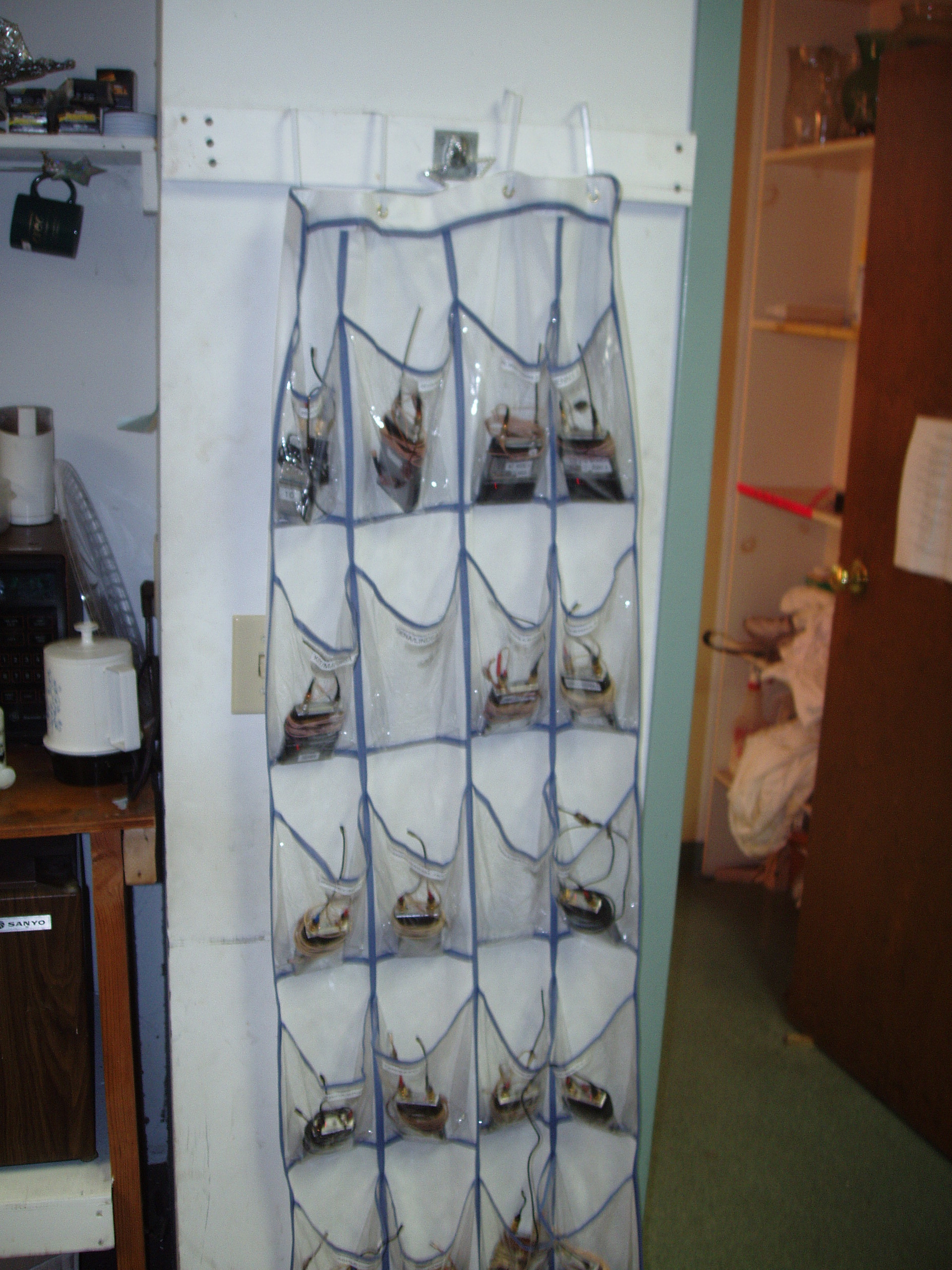
Wireless microphones awaiting pickup by performers in a musical

== Techniques ==
The professional models transmit in VHF or UHF radio frequency and have 'true' diversity reception (two separate receiver modules, each with its own antenna), which eliminates dead spots (caused by phase cancellation) and the effects caused by the reflection of the radio waves on walls and surfaces in general. (See antenna diversity).

Another technique used to improve the sound quality (actually, to improve the dynamic range), is companding. Nady Systems, Inc. was the first to offer this technology in wireless microphones in 1976, which was based on the patent obtained by company founder John Nady.

Some models have adjustable gain on the microphone itself to be able to accommodate different level sources, such as loud instruments or quiet voices. Adjustable gain helps to avoid clipping and maximize signal to noise ratio.

Some models have adjustable squelch, which silences the output when the receiver does not get a strong or quality signal from the microphone, instead of reproducing noise. When squelch is adjusted, the threshold of the signal quality or level is adjusted.

== Products ==
AKG Acoustics, Audio Ltd, Audio-Technica, Electro-Voice, Lectrosonics, MIPRO, Nady Systems, Inc, Samson Technologies, Sennheiser, Shure, Sony, Wisycom and Zaxcom are all major manufacturers of wireless microphone systems. They have made significant advances in dealing with many of the disadvantages listed above. For example, while there is a limited band in which the microphones may operate, several high-end systems can consist of over 100 different microphones operating simultaneously. However, the ability to have more microphones operating at the same time increases the cost due to component specifications, design and construction. That is one reason for such large price differences between different series of wireless systems.

Generally there are three wireless microphone types: handheld, plug-in and bodypack:

- Handheld looks like a 'normal' wired microphone, may have a bigger body to accommodate the transmitter and battery pack.
- Plug-in, plug-on, slot-in, or cube-style transmitters attach to the bottom of a standard microphone, thus converting it to wireless operation (see below).
- Bodypack is a small box housing the transmitter and battery pack, but not the microphone itself. It is attachable to clothing or on the body and has a wire going into a headset, a lavalier microphone or a guitar.

Several manufacturers including Sennheiser, AKG, Nady Systems, Lectrosonics and Zaxcom offer a plug-in transmitter for existing wired microphones, which plugs into the XLR output of the microphone and transmits to the manufacturer's standard receiver. This offers many of the benefits of an integrated system, and also allows microphone types (of which there may be no wireless equivalent) to be used without a cable. For example, a television, or film, sound production engineer may use a plug-in transmitter to enable wireless transmission of a highly directional rifle (or "shotgun") microphone, removing the safety hazard of a cable connection and permitting the production engineer greater freedom to follow the action. Plug-in transmitters also allow the conversion of vintage microphone types to cordless operation. This is useful where a vintage microphone is needed for visual or other artistic reasons, and the absence of cables allows for rapid scene changes and reducing trip hazards. In some cases these plug-in transmitters can also provide 48 volt phantom power allowing the use of condenser microphone types. DC-DC converter circuitry within the transmitter is used to multiply the battery supply, which may be three volts or less, up to the required 48 volts.

=== Receivers ===
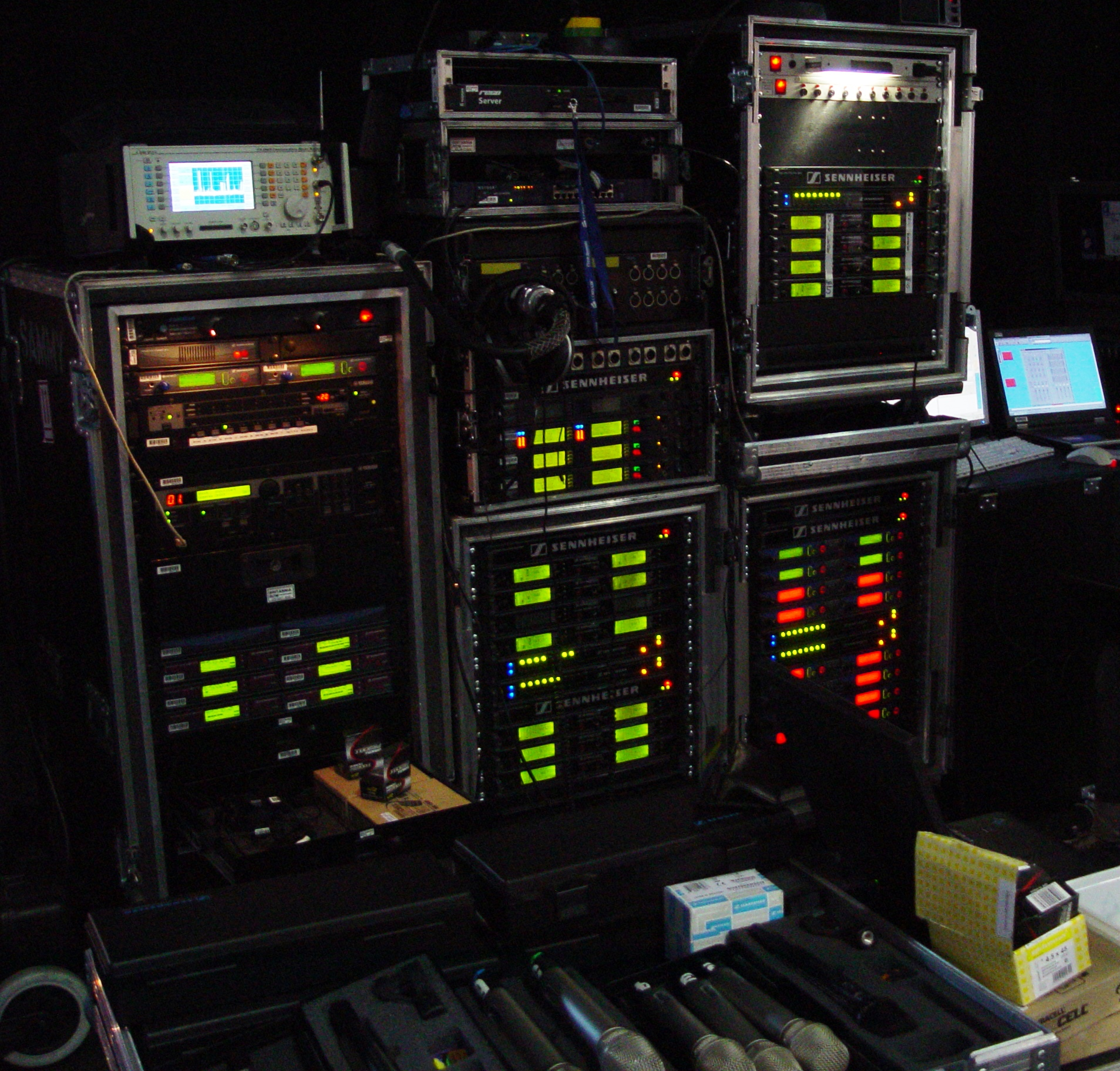
Wireless microphone receiver racks backstage at a large televised music awards event

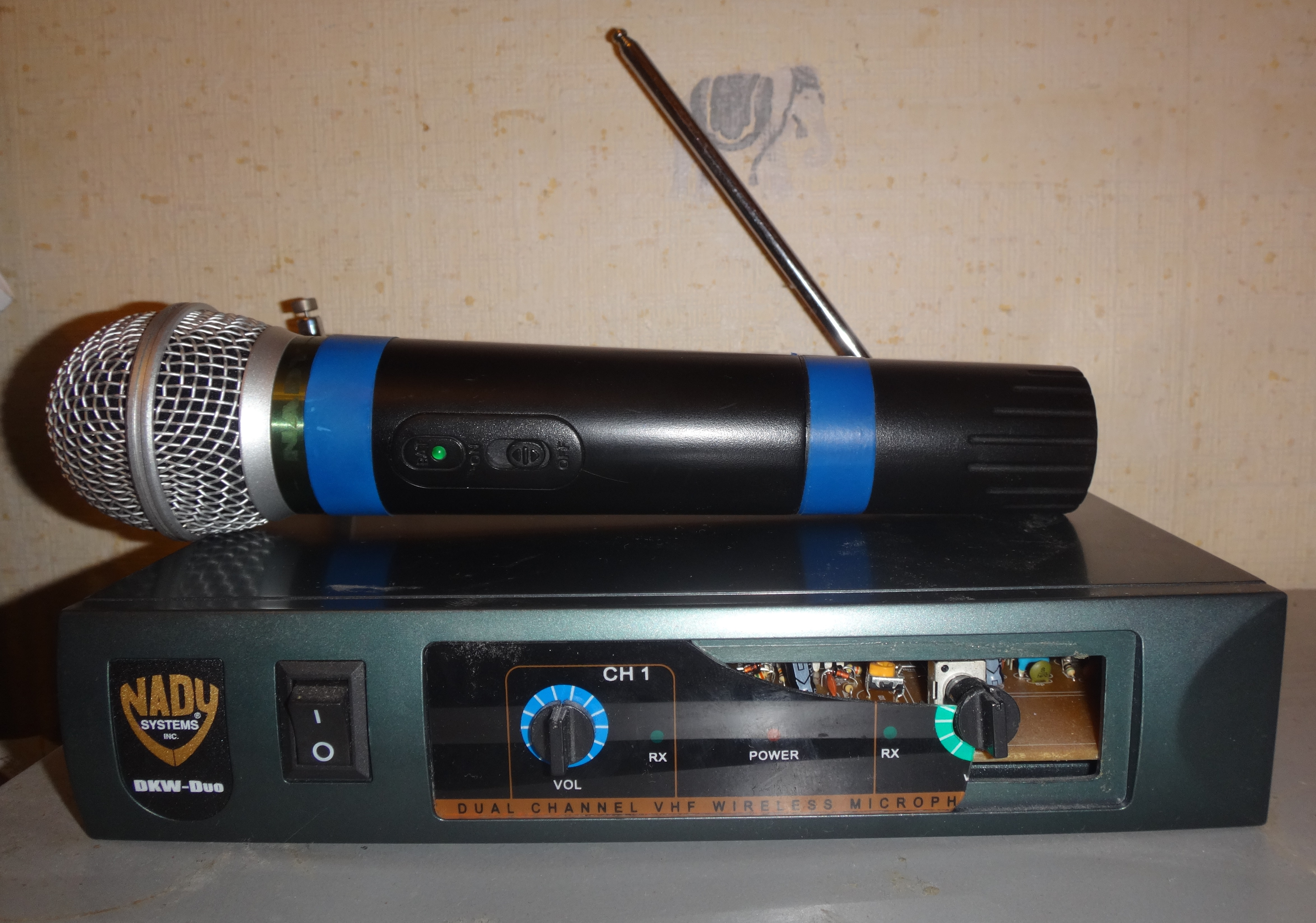
Wireless microphone and radio receiver

There are many types of receiver. True Diversity receivers have two radio modules and two antennas. Diversity receivers have one radio module and two antennas, although some times the second antenna may not be obviously visible. Non-diversity receivers have only one antenna.

Receivers are commonly housed in a half-rack configuration, so that two can be mounted together in a rack system (that is to say the receiver is enclosed in a box 1U high and half-width, so two receivers can be installed in 1U). For large complex multi channel radio microphone systems, as used in broadcast television studios and musical theater productions, modular receiver systems with several (commonly six or eight) true diversity receivers slotting into a rack-mounted mainframe housing are available. Several mainframes may be used together in a rack to supply the number of receivers required. In some musical theater productions, systems with forty or more radio microphones are not unusual.

Receivers specifically for use with video cameras are often mounted in a bodypack configuration, typically with a hotshoe mount to be fitted onto the hotshoe of the camcorder. Small true diversity receivers which slot into a special housing on many professional broadcast standard video cameras are produced by manufacturers including Sennheiser, Lectrosonics and Sony. For less demanding or more budget conscious video applications small non-diversity receivers are common. When used at relatively short operating distances from the transmitter this arrangement gives adequate and reliable performance.

== Bandwidth and spectrum ==
Almost all wireless microphone systems use wide band frequency modulation, requiring approximately 200 kHz of bandwidth. Because of the relatively large bandwidth requirements, wireless microphone use is effectively restricted to VHF and above.

Many older wireless microphone systems operate in the VHF part of the electromagnetic spectrum. Systems operating in this range are often crystal-controlled, and therefore operate on a single frequency. However, if this frequency is chosen properly, the system will be able to operate for years without any problems.

Most modern wireless microphone products operate in the UHF television band, however. In the United States, this band extends from 470 to 614 MHz. In 2010 the Federal Communications Commission issued new regulations on the operations of TV-band devices. Other countries have similar band limits; for example, as of January 2014, Great Britain's UHF TV band extends from 470 to 790 MHz. Typically, wireless microphones operate on unused TV channels ("white spaces"), with room for one to two microphones per megahertz of spectrum available.

Intermodulation (IM) is a major problem when operating multiple systems in one location. IM occurs when two or more RF signals mix in a non-linear circuit, such as an oscillator or mixer. When this occurs, predictable combinations of these frequencies can occur. For example, the combinations 2A-B, 2B-A, and A+B-C might occur, where A, B, and C are the frequencies in operation. If one of these combinations is close to the operating frequency of another system (or one of the original frequencies A, B, or C), then interference will result on that channel. The solution to this problem is to manually calculate all of the possible products, or use a computer program that does this calculation automatically.

=== Digital Hybrid Wireless ===
Digital Hybrid systems use an analog FM transmission scheme in combination with digital signal processing (DSP) to enhance the system's audio. Using DSP allows the use of digital techniques impossible in the analog domain such as predictive algorithms, thus achieving a flatter frequency response in the audio spectrum and also further reducing noise and other undesirable artifacts when compared to pure analog systems.

Another approach is to use DSP in order to emulate analog companding schemes in order to maintain compatibility between older analog systems and newer systems. Using DSP in the receiver alone can improve the overall audio performance without the penalty of increased energy consumption and resulting battery life reduction that is incurred by incorporating DSP into a battery-powered transmitter.

== Digital ==
A number of pure digital wireless microphone systems do exist, and there are many different digital modulation schemes possible.

Digital systems from Sennheiser, Sony, Shure, Zaxcom, AKG and MIPRO use the same UHF frequencies used by analog FM systems for transmission of a digital signal at a fixed bit rate. These systems encode an RF carrier with one channel, or in some cases two channels, of digital audio. Only the Sennheiser Digital 9000 system, introduced in 2013, is currently capable of transmitting full-bandwidth, uncompressed, digital audio in the same 200 kHz bandwidth UHF channels that were used by analog FM systems. The advantages offered by purely digital systems include low noise, low distortion, the opportunity for encryption, and enhanced transmission reliability.

Pure digital systems take various forms. Some systems use frequency-hopping spread spectrum technology, similar to that used for cordless phones and radio-controlled models. As this can require more bandwidth than a wideband FM signal, these microphones typically operate in the unlicensed 900 MHz, 2.4 GHz or 6 GHz bands. The absence of any requirement for a license in these frequency bands is an added attraction for many users, regardless of the technology used. The 900 MHz band is not an option outside of the US and Canada as it is used by GSM cellular mobile phone networks in most other parts of the world. The 2.4 GHz band is increasingly congested with various systems including Wi-Fi, Bluetooth and leakage from microwave ovens. The 6 GHz band has problems of range (requires line of sight) due to the extremely short transmission carrier wavelengths. The Alteros GTX Series is a local area wireless microphone network that overcomes the line-of-sight problem by utilizing up to 64 transceivers around the performance area. It is also the only system employing Ultra WideBand pulsed RF technology which doesn't generate intermodulation products common with FM, QAM and GFSK modulated carriers used by most other systems.

Digital radio microphones are inherently more difficult for the casual 'scanner' listener to intercept because conventional "scanning receivers" are generally only capable of de-modulating conventional analog modulation schemes such as FM and AM. However, some digital wireless microphone systems additionally offer encryption technology in an attempt to prevent more serious 'eavesdropping' which may be of concern for corporate users and those using radio microphones in security sensitive situations.

Manufacturers currently offering digital wireless microphone systems include AKG-Acoustics, Alteros, Audio-Technica, Lectrosonics, Line 6, MIPRO, Shure, Sony, Sennheiser and Zaxcom. All are using different digital modulation schemes from each other.

== Licensing ==
=== United Kingdom ===
In the UK, use of wireless microphone systems requires a Wireless Telegraphy Act license, except for the license free bands of 173.8–175.0 MHz and 863–865 MHz. In 2013 the UK communications regulator, Ofcom, held an auction in which the UHF band from 790 MHz to 862 MHz was sold to be used for mobile broadband services.

=== United States ===
Licenses are required to use wireless microphones on vacant TV channels in the United States as they are a part of the Broadcast Auxiliary Service (BAS). Licenses are available only to broadcasters, cable networks, television and film producers.

There are currently some wireless microphone manufacturers that are marketing wireless microphones for use in the United States that operate within the 944–952 MHz band reserved for studio-transmitter link communications. Beginning in 2017, the amount of TV band spectrum available for wireless microphone use is decreasing as a result of the incentive auction, which was completed on April 13, 2017.

=== Australia ===
In Australia, operation of wireless microphones of up to 100 mW EIRP between 520 and 694 MHz is on unused television channels and is covered by a class license, allowing any user to operate the devices without obtaining an individual license.

=== Other countries ===
Licensing in European countries is regulated by the Electronic Communications Committee (ECC) which is part of the European Conference of Postal and Telecommunications Administrations (CEPT) based in Denmark.

== White Space Devices (United States) ==
There is a move to allow the operation of personal unlicensed wideband digital devices using the UHF television spectrum in the United States. These 'white space' devices (WSDs) would be required to have GPS and access to a location database to avoid interfering with other users of the band. Initial tests performed by the FCC showed that, in some cases, prototypes of these devices were unable to correctly identify frequencies that were in use, and might therefore accidentally transmit on top of these users. Broadcasters, theaters, and wireless microphone manufacturers were firmly against these types of devices ostensibly for this reason.

Later tests by the FCC indicated that the devices could safely be used. This did not reduce the opposition by broadcasters who might also have been concerned by the possibility of entertainment delivery competition from high-speed mobile Internet access delivered in the white spaces.

On September 23, 2010, the FCC released a Memorandum Opinion and Order that determined the final rules for the use of white space for unlicensed wireless devices. The final rules adopt a proposal from the White Spaces Coalition.

== Cognitive Access (UK) ==
A similar class of device to those known in the US as White Space Devices (WSD) is being researched in the UK and probably many other countries. While the WSD situation in the US is being closely watched by interested parties in the UK and elsewhere, early in 2009 Ofcom launched research and a public consultation on Cognitive Access to the UHF interleaved spectrum. The outcome of this consultation and the related WSD activities in the US could have far reaching implications for users of UHF radio microphones in the UK and around the world.

== See also ==
- Boom operator (media)
- Electronic field production (EFP)
- Electronic news gathering (ENG)
- Filmmaking
- Personal FM transmitter
- Professional video camera
- Recording studio
- Television production
