= Nady Systems, Inc. =

American audio equipment manufacturer

Nady Systems Inc.
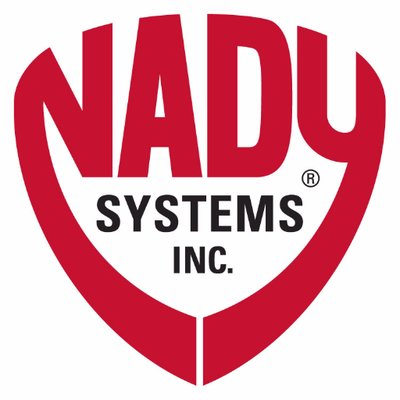
- Type: Private
- Industry: Consumer and professional audio electronics
- Founded: 1978
- Founder: John Nady
- Headquarters: Richmond, California, United States
- Area served: Worldwide
- Products: wireless microphone systems, Microphones, headphones and earphones, speakers, amplifiers, mixers, digital sound processors
- Website: nady.com

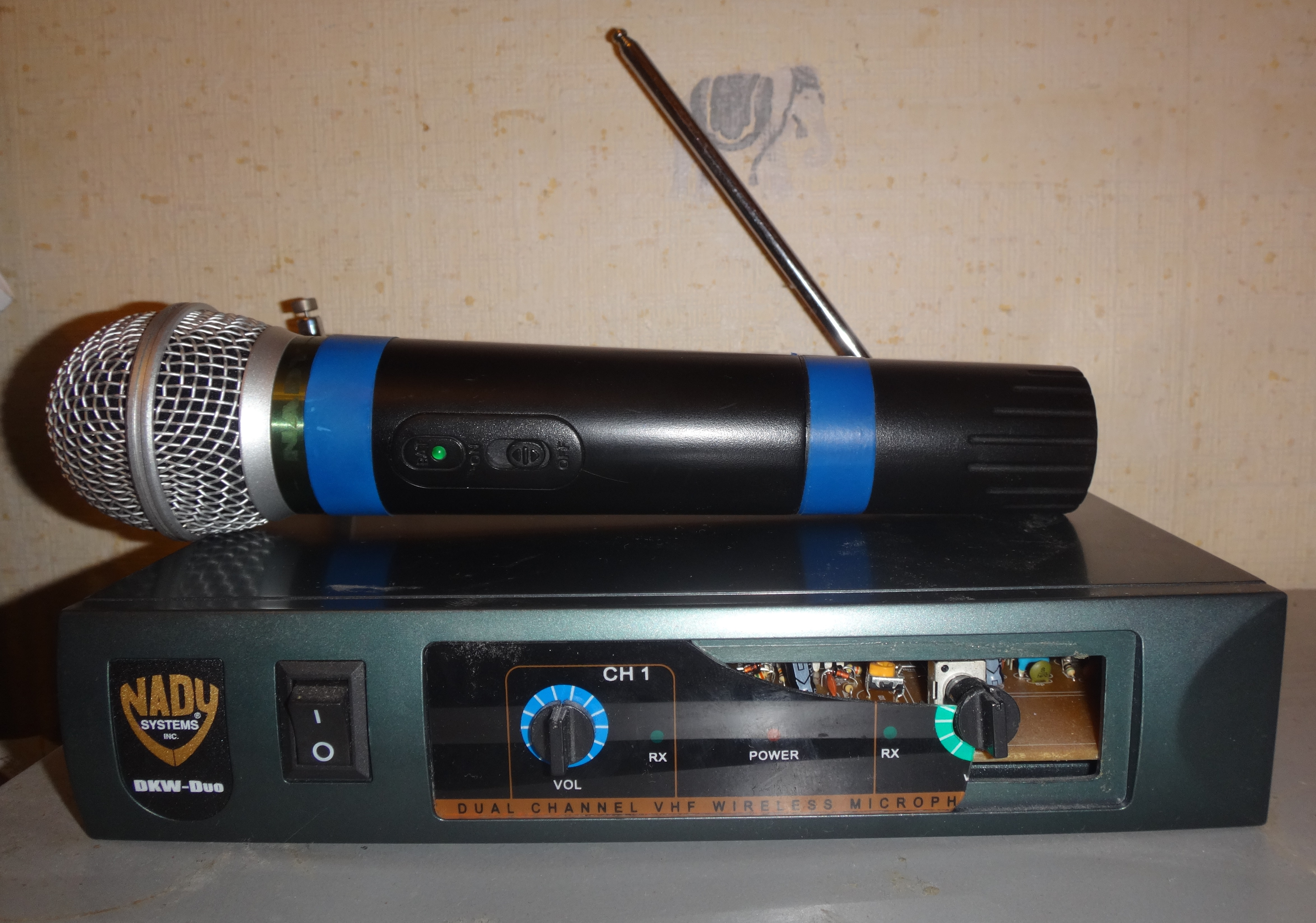
Nady DKW-Duo wireless microphone system

Nady Systems, Inc. is a professional and consumer audio product manufacturer founded in 1976 by John Nady. The company develops and manufactures a variety of audio equipment, including wireless microphones, which it pioneered.

== History ==
John Nady, who played rock and blues guitar in Berkeley, California bands, Chains, Shotgun and Titanic, had a master's degree in electrical engineering from the University of California, Berkeley and developed and patented a companding process that enabled long-range wireless microphones. He demonstrated his microphone in performance, walking around in the audience while continuing to play, and it was also demonstrated by Elvin Bishop at a private party. Aerosmith used Nady microphones at a 1978 show at the Cow Palace near San Francisco, and the Rolling Stones commissioned a 12-channel system for their 1981 American tour.

Nady developed his system in his kitchen in Berkeley, then in a warehouse in Oakland. He formed Nasty Wireless in the late 1960s with family funding, patented the microphone in 1977, and changed the company name to Nady Wireless in 1978 and later to Nady Systems. It came to have 125 employees in Oakland, with manufacturing in China. By the mid-1980s, other musical artists using the company's wireless equipment included Neil Young, Madonna, Bruce Springsteen, Stevie Wonder, Jefferson Starship, Toto, and Styx. Nady also owned clubs in Oakland, San Francisco, and Santa Clara. After patent-avoiding rivals emerged, he sold his patents; he sold Nady Systems to PromarkBrands in 2019, and died in 2024.

Nady Systems is credited with developing a number of innovations in the field of wireless audio, including the first in-ear monitor system (1978), the first ultra-light wireless head microphone for professional stage performance (1984), the first wireless guitar and bass with built-in transmitter (1986), and the first PLL synthesized UHF frequency agile wireless system (1991).

Nady's original focus was live performance. The company's products have also been used in producing broadcast television content, including the Golden Globe Awards, the Grammy Awards, and The Lawrence Welk Show. In 1996, Nady Systems' contribution to television was recognized by the National Academy of Television Arts and Sciences with an Emmy Award to John Nady for Outstanding Technical Achievement in pioneering wireless microphone technology. Nady Systems also sells to houses of worship and educational institutions.
