= Ribbon microphone =

Type of microphone

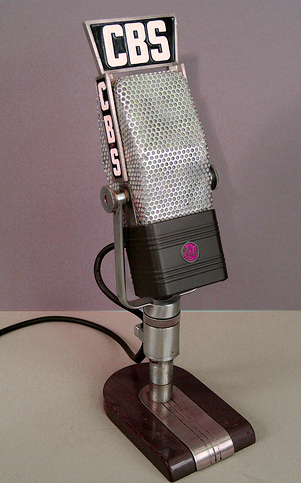
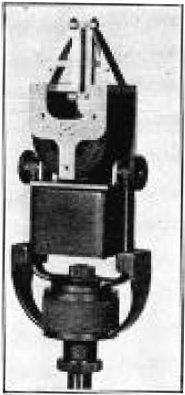
(left) RCA 44-BX ribbon microphone from 1940. (right) RCA Type 44 with the cover off. The magnet is visible at center, and the narrow aluminum ribbon is suspended between the triangular pole pieces (top).

A ribbon microphone is a type of microphone that uses a thin, electrically conductive ribbon (typically of aluminum, duraluminum or nanofilm) placed between the poles of a magnet to produce a voltage by electromagnetic induction. Ribbon microphones are typically bidirectional, meaning that they pick up sounds equally well from either side of the microphone but reject sounds from the sides.

== Principle of operation ==
The sensitivity pattern (black lobes) of a bidirectional microphone (red dot) viewed from above.

Principle of operation

In a moving-coil microphone, the diaphragm is attached to a light movable coil that generates a voltage as it moves back and forth between the poles of a permanent magnet. In ribbon microphones, a very thin light metal ribbon (usually corrugated) is suspended between the poles of a magnet. As the ribbon vibrates due to the sound it is exposed to, a voltage is induced at right angles to both the movement of the ribbon and magnetic field direction and is picked off by contacts at each end of the ribbon. Ribbon microphones are also called velocity microphones because the induced voltage is proportional to the velocity of the ribbon and thus of the air particles in the sound wave, unlike in some other microphones where the voltage is proportional to the displacement of the diaphragm and the air.

One important advantage that the ribbon microphone had when it was introduced is that its very lightweight ribbon, which is under very little tension, has a resonant frequency lower than 20 Hz; in contrast to the typical resonant frequency of the diaphragms in other microphone types which is within the range of human hearing. So even the very early commercially available ribbon microphones had excellent frequency response throughout the nominal range of human hearing (20 Hz to 20 kHz for a young adult).

The native voltage output of ribbon microphones is typically quite low compared to a dynamic moving-coil microphone, and an internal step-up transformer is typically included to increase the voltage output with a corresponding increase in output impedance.

The ribbon microphone is an electrically simple design with no active circuitry; it is possible to build one from a kit, or with basic tools and materials. The acoustic complexity of ribbon microphones is comparable to other types of air coupled transducers.

Ribbon microphones were once delicate and expensive, but modern materials make certain present-day ribbon microphones very durable, and so they may be used in loud environments and for stage work. They are prized for their ability to capture high-frequency detail, comparing very favorably with condenser microphones, which can often sound subjectively aggressive or brittle in the high end of the frequency spectrum. Due to their bidirectional pick-up pattern, ribbon microphones may be used in pairs to produce the Blumlein pair recording array. In addition to the standard bidirectional pick-up pattern, ribbon microphones can also be configured to have cardioid, hypercardioid, and variable pattern.

As many mixers are equipped with phantom power in order to enable the use of condenser microphones, care should be taken when using condenser and ribbon microphones at the same time. If the ribbon microphone is improperly wired, which is not unheard of with older microphones, this capability can damage some ribbon elements; however, improvements in designs and materials have made those concerns largely inconsequential in modern ribbon microphones.

== History ==
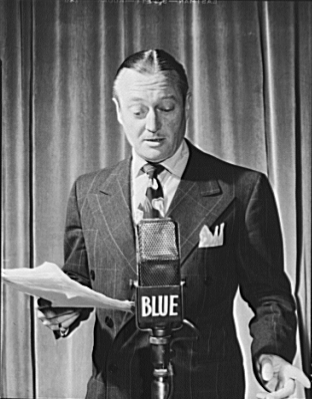
Edmund Lowe using a ribbon microphone in 1942

In the early 1920s, Walter H. Schottky and Erwin Gerlach co-invented the first ribbon microphone. By turning the ribbon circuit in the opposite direction, they also invented the first ribbon loudspeaker. A few years later, Harry F. Olson of RCA started developing ribbon microphones using field coils and permanent magnets. The RCA Photophone Type PB-31 was commercially manufactured in 1931. Condenser microphones at the time could not compare to its frequency response. Radio City Music Hall employed PB-31s in 1932. The following year, RCA introduced the Type 44A Velocity Microphone. Its tone and pattern control helped reduce reverberation. Many RCA ribbon models are still in use and valued by audio engineers.

The BBC-Marconi Type A was an iconic ribbon microphone produced by the BBC and Marconi between 1934 and 1959. Also of note is the ST&C Coles 4038 (or PGS – pressure gradient single), designed by the BBC in 1954 and still used for some applications to this day. Its historical uses varied from talks to symphony concerts, and it is regarded as a delicate, fine traditional microphone. The German Beyerdynamic M 160 was introduced in 1957, fitted with a smaller microphone element with two 15 mm ribbons combined to create a highly directional pickup pattern. The microphone proved to be popular in recording studios.

RCA eventually abandoned ribbon mic manufacturing and in 1976 transferred the servicing of their microphones to Pasadena, CA based Audio Engineering Associates. When replacement parts were exhausted, AEA began manufacturing components locally and in 1998 released the R44C—a museum-quality replica of the original RCA microphone.

Around 2002, relatively inexpensive ($80 – $200) ribbon microphones manufactured in China and inspired by the RCA-44 and older Soviet Oktava ribbon microphones became available. UK-based Stewart Taverner and his company XAudia developed "The Beeb", modifying vintage Reslo ribbon microphones for better tone, performance and increased output.

In 2007, microphones employing ribbon elements made of strong nanomaterials became available, offering orders of magnitude improvement in signal purity and output level.

== See also ==
- Audio recording
