= Reslosound =

Reslosound - also known as Reslo were British manufacturers of electrical musical equipment. In particular they were very well known for the RB Ribbon microphone. This is sometimes referred to as the "Beatles Mic" as they were used a great deal in the Cavern in Liverpool England as well as many other live music venues, recording studios and broadcasters in the 1960s. Notably the BBC used them and they could be seen in many programmes including their flagship sports programme Grandstand. Ribbon microphones in general have made a big comeback over the last few years and many producers (including Mick Glossop) and musicians are using the Reslosound microphones again after finding their sound provides a warm classic tone.
