= AEA Ribbon Mics =

American audio equipment company

AEA Ribbon Mics Inc is an American audio equipment manufacturing company that manufactures ribbon microphones, professional audio electronics, and accessories based in Pasadena, California. Audio Engineering Associates (AEA) was established by Wes Dooley in 1965 as a record label. Starting in 1976, AEA began repairing and servicing RCA 44BX ribbon microphones. AEA microphone models include R44, R84, R92, R88, N8, N13, N22, KU5a, and KU4. Electronics include TDI active direct box, TRP3 preamp, RPQ3 preamp, TRP500 and RPQ500. AEA's electronics are designed by circuit designer Fred Forssell. AEA services and repairs vintage ribbon microphones, Coles microphones, and vintage microphone accessories. They have been servicing RCA ribbons since the 70s and have many spare parts in stock and available for purchase.

The R44 is a re-creation of the RCA 44BX and is well accepted by professional audio engineers as a replacement for the classic version.

AEA has partnered with notable organizations in the folk and Americana genres, including the Folk Alliance, AmericanaFest, The Bluegrass Situation, and more.

== Awards and recognition ==
AEA R44C received NAMM TECnology Hall of Fame Award in 2017.

AEA was a finalist of the 39th Annual TEC Awards.

AEA won two TEC Awards in 2026. The AEA N28 Stereo Ribbon Microphone won a TEC Award in Microphones—Recording, while the AEA TDI Duo Dual Phantom Powered Direct Box won in the Production Essentials category.
