= Georg Neumann (entrepreneur) =

German electronics engineer and entrepreneur (1898–1976)

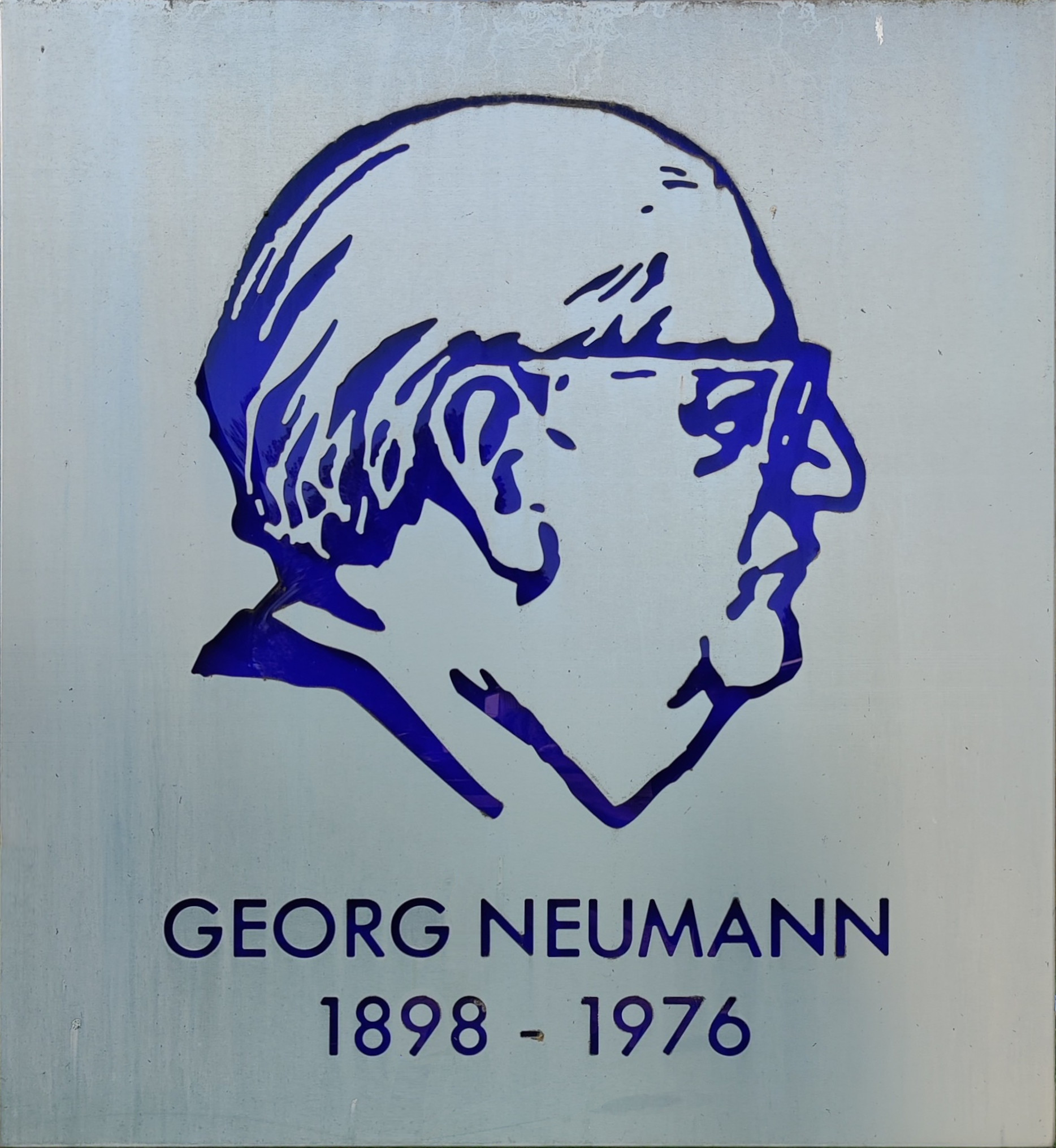
- Born: 13 October 1898; Germany
- Died: 30 August 1976 (aged 77)
- Occupations: Entrepreneur; audio engineer
- Known for: Designing recording and audio mixing equipment

Georg Neumann (13 October 1898 – 30 August 1976) was a German entrepreneur and developer of electroacoustic equipment, particularly microphones.

== Early life ==
Neumann was born in Chorin, Brandenburg, the son of a railway employee. He received his technical training in Berlin at Mix & Genest and at the AEG Kabelwerk Oberspree.

== Career ==
In 1923, Germany's first radio station near Berlin began using the Eugen Reisz microphone, whose development Neumann had helped shape. In 1928, Neumann and Erich Rickmann founded Georg Neumann & Co. in Berlin in Berlin. The company's goal was to manufacture condenser microphones, in which sound waves vibrate the diaphragm of a capacitor, producing an electrical signal through changes in capacitance. This technology was implemented in the CMV3, which became the company's first commercial microphone.

CMV3 Microphone

At the 1936 Summer Olympics in Berlin, the first version of Neumann's condenser microphone, featuring the M7 capsule in a low-frequency valve circuit, underwent its first major live test. During the early 1940s, the company's premises on Michaelkirchstraße in Berlin were damaged by bombing. In 1943, most of the company and its employees relocated to a former textile factory in Gefell, Vogtland. Because its products were considered important for wartime propaganda, the company was classified as essential to the war effort.

After the Second World War, Neumann re-established production in Berlin in 1947 by founding Georg Neumann GmbH in the Kreuzberg district. In addition to condenser microphones, the company manufactured disc-cutting lathes and large studio mixing consoles. Neumann continued to oversee the Gefell operation, although it was gradually nationalized after the establishment of East Germany (GDR) and was eventually renamed VEB Mikrofontechnik Gefell.

== Notable inventions ==
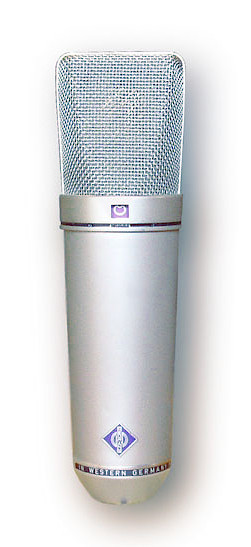
Neumann U87 condenser microphone

- Neumann CMV3 - the first mass-produced condenser microphone.
- Neumann U 47 - the first studio microphone with switchable polar patterns.
- Neumann M 49 - the first studio microphone with remotely controllable polar patterns.
- Neumann U 87 - the longest continuously produced condenser microphone in history.

== Personal life ==
Neumann died in 1976. He was married and had two children.

== Legacy ==
In 2008, the Georg Neumann Hall was established in a renovated building of the Berlin University of the Arts and is used by the university's Jazz Institute.

In 2013, the Georg Neumann Museum was opened at the Microtech Gefell factory. Its exhibits include a prototype of the KEM 970 cardioid plane microphone, an experimental UM 92 microphone, and an early CMV5 fitted with an M7 capsule.

== See also ==
- Georg Neumann GmbH
