= U87 =

U87 may refer to:

- German submarine U-87, various vessels
- HMS Kite (U87), a sloop of the Royal Navy
- Neumann U 87, a microphone produced by the Georg Neumann company
- Small nucleolar RNA SNORD87
- U-87 MG, a human glioblastoma cell line used in research
- U87, a 2005 album by Eason Chan
