= Neumann CMV3 =

Condenser microphone

Neumann CMV3

The Neumann CMV 3 was the world's first commercially produced condenser microphone. Developed by Georg Neumann, it was introduced in 1928 and distributed internationally by Georg Neumann & Co. beginning in 1930. Owing to its distinctive cylindrical shape, it became known as the "Neumann Bottle" (Neumann-Flasche).

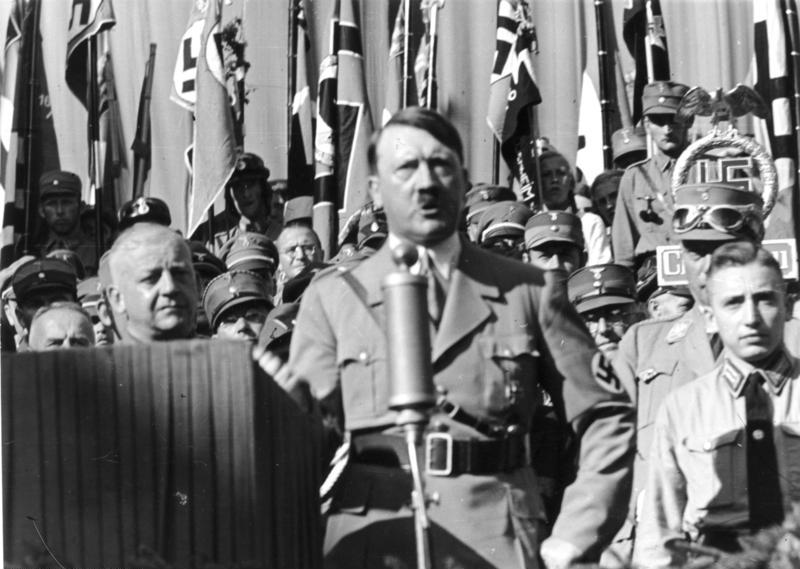
Adolf Hitler speaking to a crowd in 1935 with a Neumann CMV3

In the United States, it was also colloquially referred to as the "Hitler Bottle" because of its frequent appearance in newsreel footage of Adolf Hitler's speeches.

== See also ==
- Neumann U 47
- Neumann M 49
- Neumann U 87
