= Beyerdynamic M 160 =

German ribbon microphone

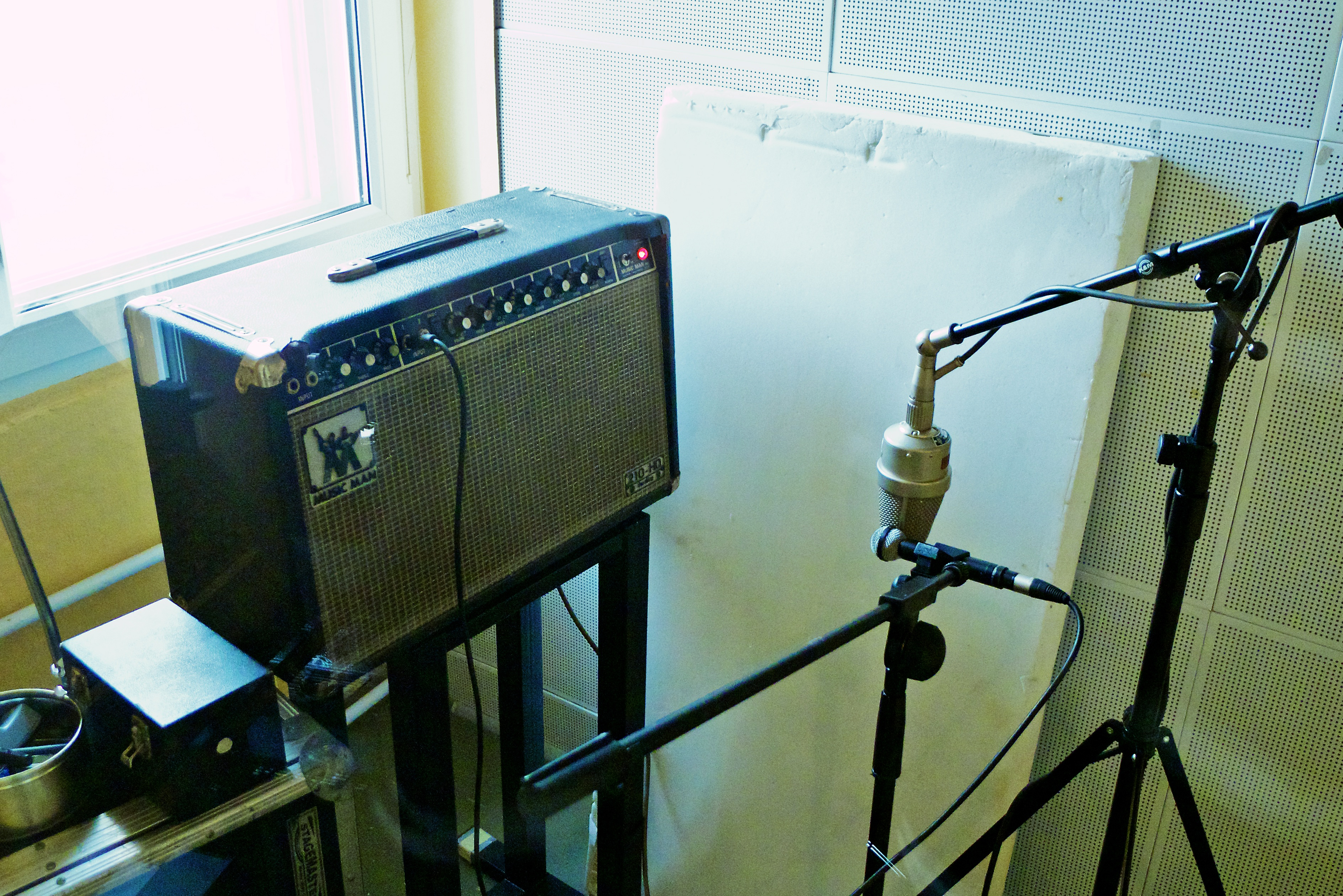
A Beyerdynamic M160 (right) next to a Neumann M 49, both pointed at a guitar amp

The Beyerdynamic M 160, sometimes referred to as Beyer M160, is a German hypercardioid ribbon microphone used for speech in broadcasting and for music in live concerts and the recording studio. Introduced in 1957 by Beyerdynamic, the M 160 was initially based on a rugged dual-ribbon transducer element with alnico magnets. The two 15-millimeter (0.59 in) ribbons combine to yield a highly directional pickup pattern. The ribbon assembly is turned 90 degrees away from the usual configuration to make the M 160 an end-address model; the similar M 130 model is a side-address microphone with a figure-8 pickup pattern. The structure later incorporated neodymium magnets as they became available.

The M 160 is known for its ability to soften the harsh characteristics of strident sound sources. David Bowie sang into an M 160 for most of the songs on Young Americans. Engineer Andy Johns used a distant pair of M 160s (along with other processing) on John Bonham's drum kit for the Led Zeppelin version of "When the Levee Breaks". The M 160 is commonly used on guitar amplifiers, for instance, engineer Eddie Kramer recorded both the voice and the guitar of Jimi Hendrix on M 160s, starting in 1967 halfway through the sessions for Are You Experienced. Producer Phil Ramone used an M 160 to record Billy Joel's voice on every album from 1977 to 1986. The main electric guitar riff of Michael Jackson's "Black or White" was recorded with an M 160 in 1989 by Bill Bottrell.

Still in production after more than six decades, the M 160 was inducted into the TEC Awards Technology Hall of Fame in 2019.
