= Joachim Wetzel =

East Germany Microphone Builder

Joachim Wetzel (born December 31, 1918, in Aue, Germany) was a German radio engineer and microphone maker.

Wetzel was a trained radio engineer with a master craftsman's certificate. He founded a small workshop in his parents' house in Leipzig in late 1945 when he returned home after a brief war imprisonment period. At that time, Wetzel was particularly interested in the development and construction of reel tape recorders, condenser microphones and electrostatic tweeters. Later, after the company was running successfully, he opened a larger workshop in 16 Lindenstrasse, Leipzig. This is where the first condenser microphones were produced. He developed his own capsules in the style of Neumann M7, which were also supplied to other microphone manufacturers like Thiele or Adler. From 1960 on, Joachim Wetzel only manufactured microphones in his workshop, although he also provided repair services for other microphone manufacturers, so it is possible to find RFT, ERWA or Neumann microphones that have Joachim Wetzel stickers, meaning they were serviced by him. Over the years he continued to manage his repair workshop, maintaining and servicing microphones, but also TV sets and cassette decks until shortly before his death in May 1989.

== Models ==
Wetzel microphone series - Some microphones were built with different tube body, depending on what was currently available at the time, mixed with self-developed prefabricated plastic parts.

Tube: ECC83

Capsule: Wetzel M7 type capsule

The microphones were built with omnidirectional or cardioid polar patterns. There are also some model with gold plated bodies.

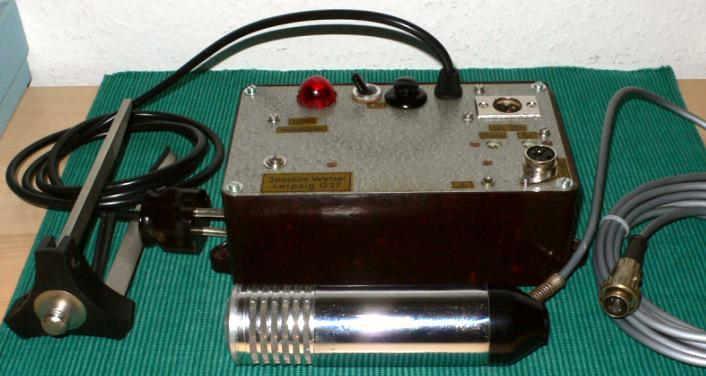

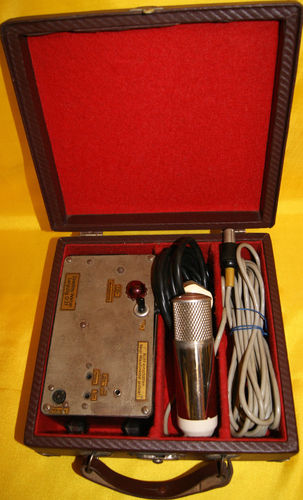

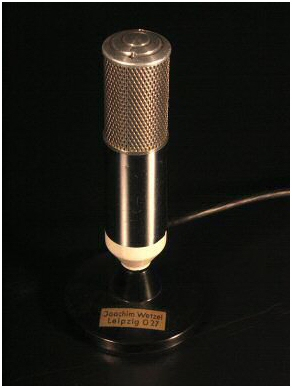
