= Beyerdynamic =

German audio equipment manufacturer

Beyerdynamic GmbH & Co. KG
- Type: Private
- Industry: Audio electronics
- Founded: 1924; 102 years ago in Berlin
- Founder: Eugen Beyer
- Headquarters: Heilbronn, Germany
- Key people: Supervisory board of directors: Shirley Beyer; John Midgley; Matthias Mühling; Andreas Rapp (CEO); Sebastian Strohm (CEO)
- Products: Microphones; Headphones; Wireless audio systems; Conference systems
- Number of employees: 500 worldwide
- Website: global.beyerdynamic.com

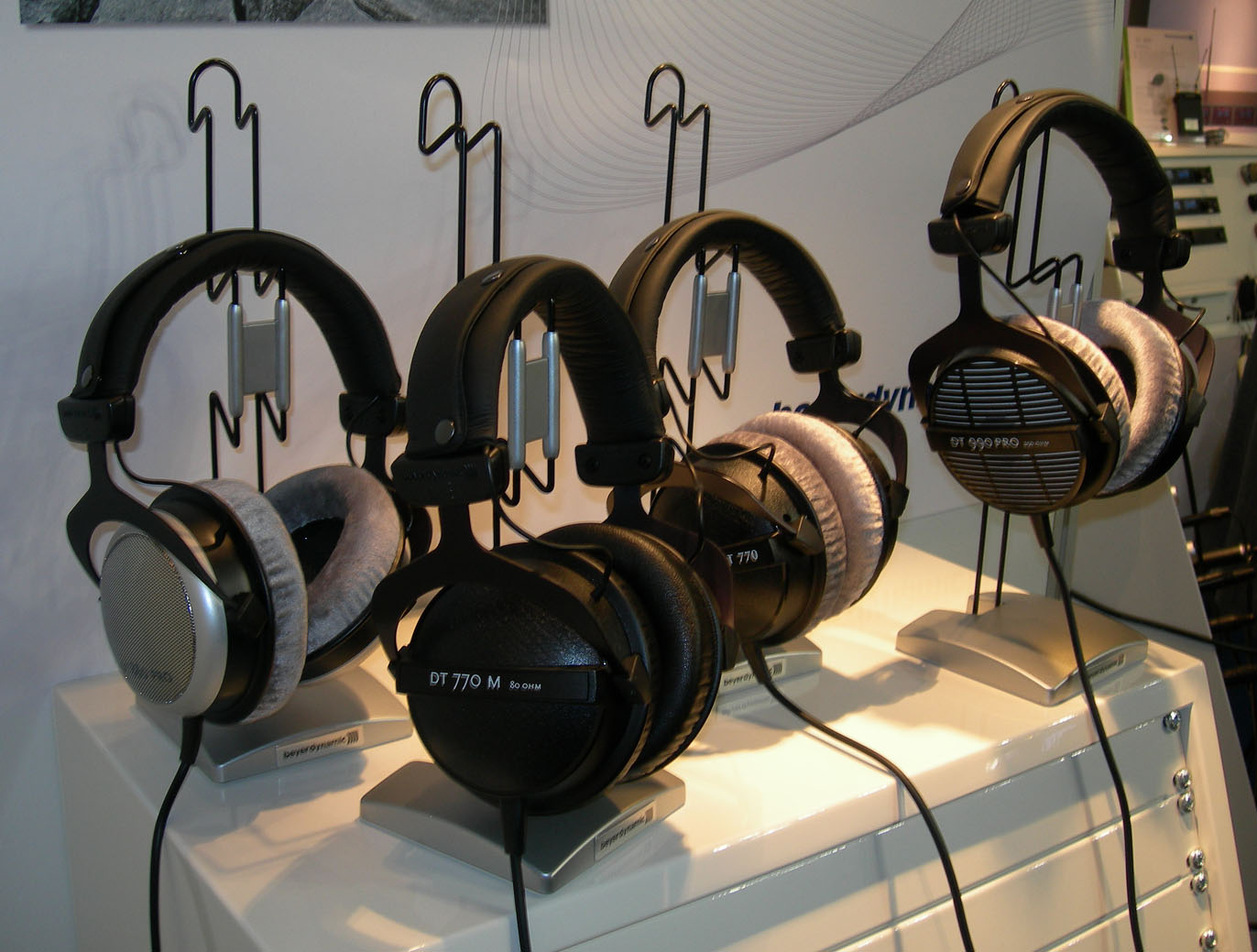
Headphones by Beyerdynamic: DT 880 PRO, DT 770 M, DT 770, DT 990 PRO

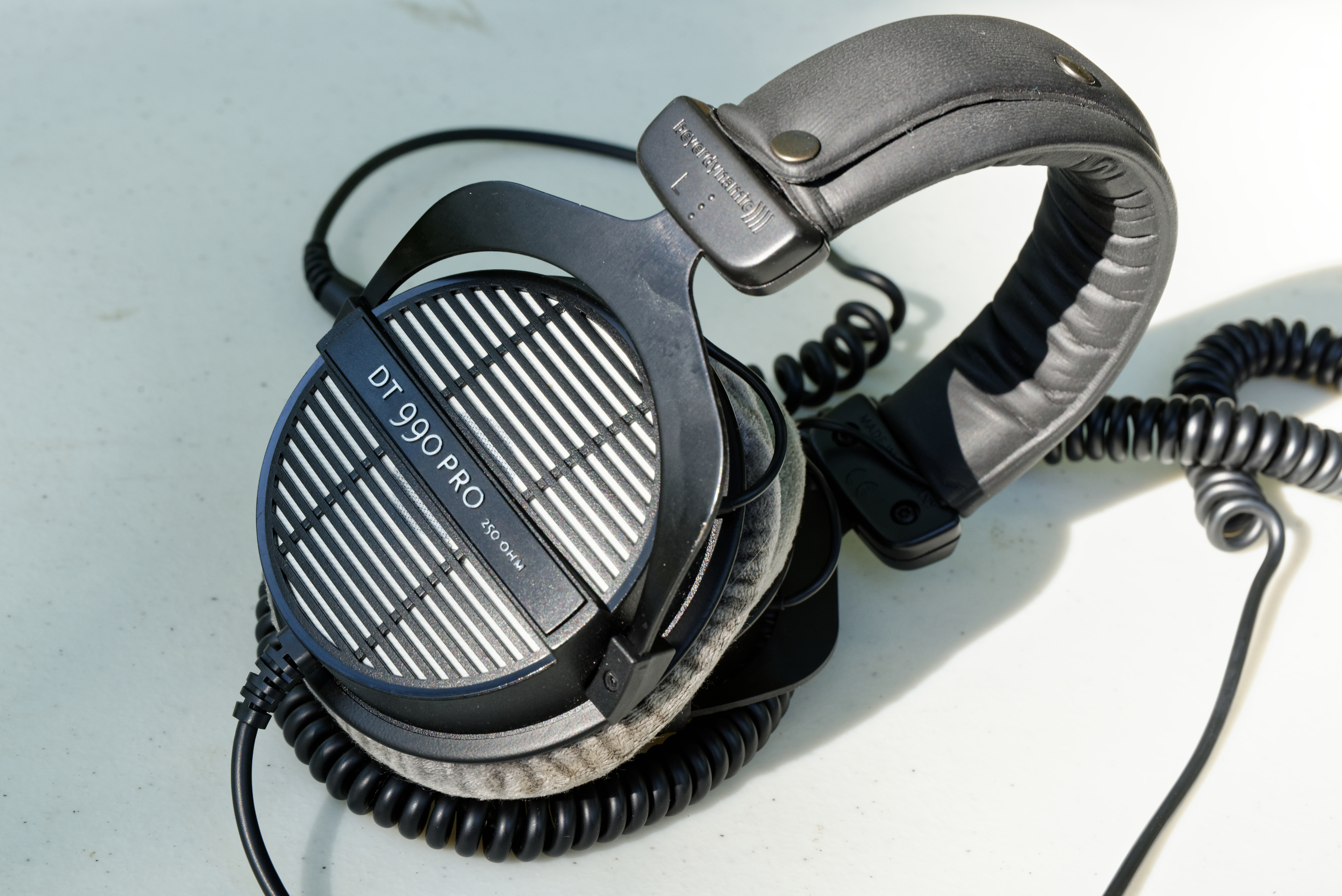
DT 990 PRO headphones

Beyerdynamic GmbH & Co. KG (stylized as beyerdynamic) is a German manufacturer of microphones, headphones, wireless audio systems, and conference systems. Headquartered in Heilbronn, Germany, Beyerdynamic has been family-owned since its founding in 1924 until 2025. In June 2025, Beyerdynamic announced its sale to the Chinese company Cosonic Intelligent, for a reported 122 million Euros (approximately $141 million USD).

== History ==
In the 1920s in Berlin, founder Eugen Beyer believed that cinema presented a new opportunity in communication media. The first products he produced were loudspeakers for film palaces in 1924 under the company name "Elektrotechnische Fabrik Eugen Beyer". At the end of the 1930s, Beyer developed the first pair of dynamic headphones, the DT 48 (“Dynamic Telephone”). The DT 48 would stay in production until 2012. In 1937, Beyerdynamic launched the M 19, its first studio-quality dynamic microphone. World War II (1937–1945) temporarily froze production, given the destruction of the Berlin factory; however, in 1948, Beyerdynamic sought new beginnings in Heilbronn. The "Stielhörer" DT 49 became a popular item of "Plattenbars" (record-bars) in the 1950s.

Beyerdynamic developed the highly directional ribbon microphone Beyerdynamic M 160 model in 1957, along with the figure-8 pattern M 130. These microphones contained dual ribbon aluminum elements suspended between alnico magnets. The M 160 went on to become a classic recording studio microphone, still in production after more than six decades.

In 1959, Beyer passed away unexpectedly at the age of 56. His 26-year-old son, Fred R. Beyer, took over the company and remained at its helm for over 40 years. In 1960, the company moved its headquarters to the Heilbronn location, and a few years later, its name was changed to "Beyer Dynamic".

The "transistophone", the company's first wireless microphone, went into production in 1962. The Beatles' 1966 German tour used the E-1000 microphone. In 1985, Beyerdynamic acquired its then-North American distributor, Burns Audiotronics, which became its North American subsidiary. Today Beyerdynamic, Inc. have their own office headquartered in Farmingdale, New York.

At the 1988 Olympic Games in Seoul, all media reporting sites were equipped with headsets from Beyerdynamic. In 1999, the new Bundestag in Berlin was fitted with Beyerdynamic's digital microphones.

In 2014, to celebrate its 90th anniversary, Beyerdynamic launched a special edition of its T90 model at Munich's High End Show.

Beyerdynamic has had the most success in the European and American markets.

In May 2025, the company announced it was adding the DT 770 PRO X studio headphones, which were originally limited-edition releases in 2024, to its permanent product line.

As of June 2025, about 85% of Beyerdynamic's microphones and headphones were handmade at its production site in Heilbronn, Germany. According to an interview with Managing Director Richard Campbell, Beyerdynamic products would continue to be handmade and produced in Germany, even after the acquisition by Cosonic International.

In October 2025, Beyerdynamic introduced the DT 270 PRO headphones, a new entry to its PRO Studio lineup. The DT 270 PRO are built for sound engineers, podcasters, and musicians.

== Reception ==
The Beatles' 1966 German tour used the E-1000 microphone. Other artist, like Elton John, ABBA, and Stevie Wonder all sang into sound transformers produced by Beyerdynamic.

Producer-engineer Eddie Kramer recorded Jimi Hendrix’s vocals and amplifier with the M160. Andy Johns also used the M160 to obtain John Bonham’s drum tone for Led Zeppelin’s “When the Levee Breaks.”

The M88 directional microphone, introduced in 1963, was the only microphone used by Queen Elizabeth II during her first visit to Australia in 1969.

== Awards ==
In 2017, two Beyerdynamic products won awards at the What Hi-Fi Awards: the Amiron Home won the "best home on-ear heaphones price at £400+" and the Byron wired model won "best in-ear headphones under £50".

The Aventho wireless headphones were named a Consumer Technology Association (CES) 2018 Innovation Awards Honoree.

In 2019, Beyerdynamic's M 160 double ribbon microphone, first produced in 1957, was inducted into the NAMM TECnology Hall of Fame.

In 2020, Beyerdynamic's T1 3rd Generation and T5 3rd Generation were both awarded five stars for sound, comfort, and build by What Hi Fi.

In 2025, Beyerdynamic's AMIRON 300 and AVENTHO 300 headphone models won the Red Dot Design Award.

== See also ==
- List of microphone manufacturers
