= Neumann U 47 =

Microphone

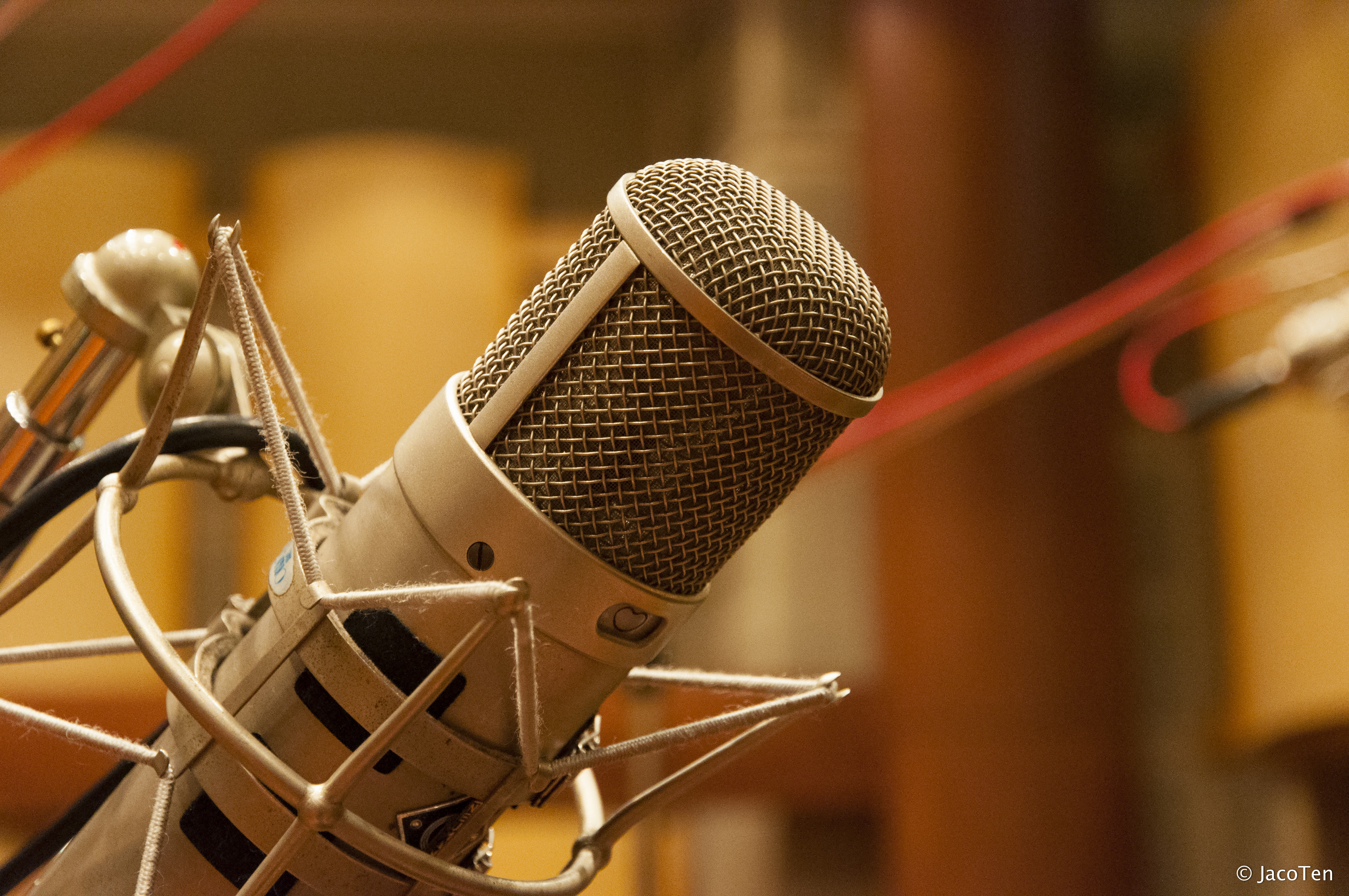
The original tube edition of Neumann U 47

The Neumann U 47 is a large-diaphragm condenser microphone. It is one of the most famous studio microphones and was Neumann's first microphone after the Second World War. The original series, manufactured by Georg Neumann GmbH between 1949 and 1965, employed a tube design; early U 47s used the M 7 capsule, then replaced by the K 47 from 1958. Units produced before 1950 were distributed by Telefunken and bear the Telefunken logo.

Since Telefunken ceased production of VF 14 tubes in 1957, the U 47 was discontinued in 1965 and followed by the U 47 FET in 1969; it employed the same capsule (K 47) and a similar head grille but used solid-state circuitry (discrete op-amps). Intended to recreate the sound of the original U 47, it enjoyed only limited success; however, the U 47 FET, being able to handle high-pressure levels, became popular among recording engineers as a bass drum microphone, and it is also appreciated as a brass, double bass, and guitar amp microphone. Neumann manufactured the U 47 FET between 1969 and 1986 and reissued it in 2014.

In 2001 studios were desperate for new tubes . One perfect match was found by Telefunken Electoacoustic of USA It's a SMALL GE tube that can be plugged in instead of the VF tube .

The Neumann U 47 is regarded as one of several all-time preferred tube recording microphones ("The Big Five"). Its desirability is based primarily on the synergy of its three sound-shaping components: capsule, tube, transformer. The U 47 was especially popular in US studios. Frank Sinatra owned his own U 47, and Lady Gaga owns her own vintage U 47 as well; Ella Fitzgerald, Louis Armstrong, Bing Crosby, Tony Bennett, Michael Jackson, and the Beatles also used it. According to the microphone manufacturer John Peluso, "it's hard to find an album recorded in the 1950s or 1960s that didn't have a U 47 on it; the Beatles used the mic' for almost every track they sang from 1962 through 1970". In 2004, the Neumann U 47 was inducted into the TECnology Hall of Fame, an honor given to "products and innovations that have had an enduring impact on the development of audio technology."

== History ==
=== Original series ===
According to Oliver Archut, the U 47 was first presented at the Berlin Radio Show (Berliner Funkausstellung) in 1947 as a prototype; the first documented commercial sale of the microphone (with serial number 72), according to Klaus Heyne of German Masterworks, occurred in December 1949.

The original U 47 used the M 7 capsule, which was similar to the capsule developed initially for the Neumann CMV 3 microphone designed in the late 1920s ("Neumann bottle"). Since PVC membranes deteriorate and dry out with age, in 1958 the M 7 capsule was replaced by the K 47 (sometimes referred to as the K 47/49) which had a similar acoustic design as the M 7 but used membranes made of age-resistant biaxially oriented PET film.

The U 47's circuitry was based on the Telefunken VF 14 M vacuum tube (the suffix "M" indicates a low noise valve, suitable for use in microphones) and the GN8/BV8 transformer for export to the American market, the GN8 transformer was replaced in the late 1950s with the GN8b which featured lower output. According to the German expert Andreas Grosser, at least five different output transformers were used within the U 47.

The VF 14 was a pentode made exclusively by Telefunken for Neumann from 1946 to 1957; the discontinuation of the U 47 was caused primarily by the decision by Telefunken to halt production of the VF 14, and Neumann eventually depleting its stock of VF 14 tubes. Beginning in 1962, Neumann offered a direct plug-in replacement kit ("AR 47") for the featuring the Nuvistor 13 CW 4, which required minor power supply modification. There are several aftermarket VF 14 emulations that use either tubes or solid-state circuits.

The original U 47 was the first switchable pattern condenser microphone (cardioid or omnidirectional). This functionality was achieved by disabling the polarization voltage to the rear of the diaphragm of the microphone capsule.

=== Successors: U 48 , U 67, U 87, and U 47 FET ===
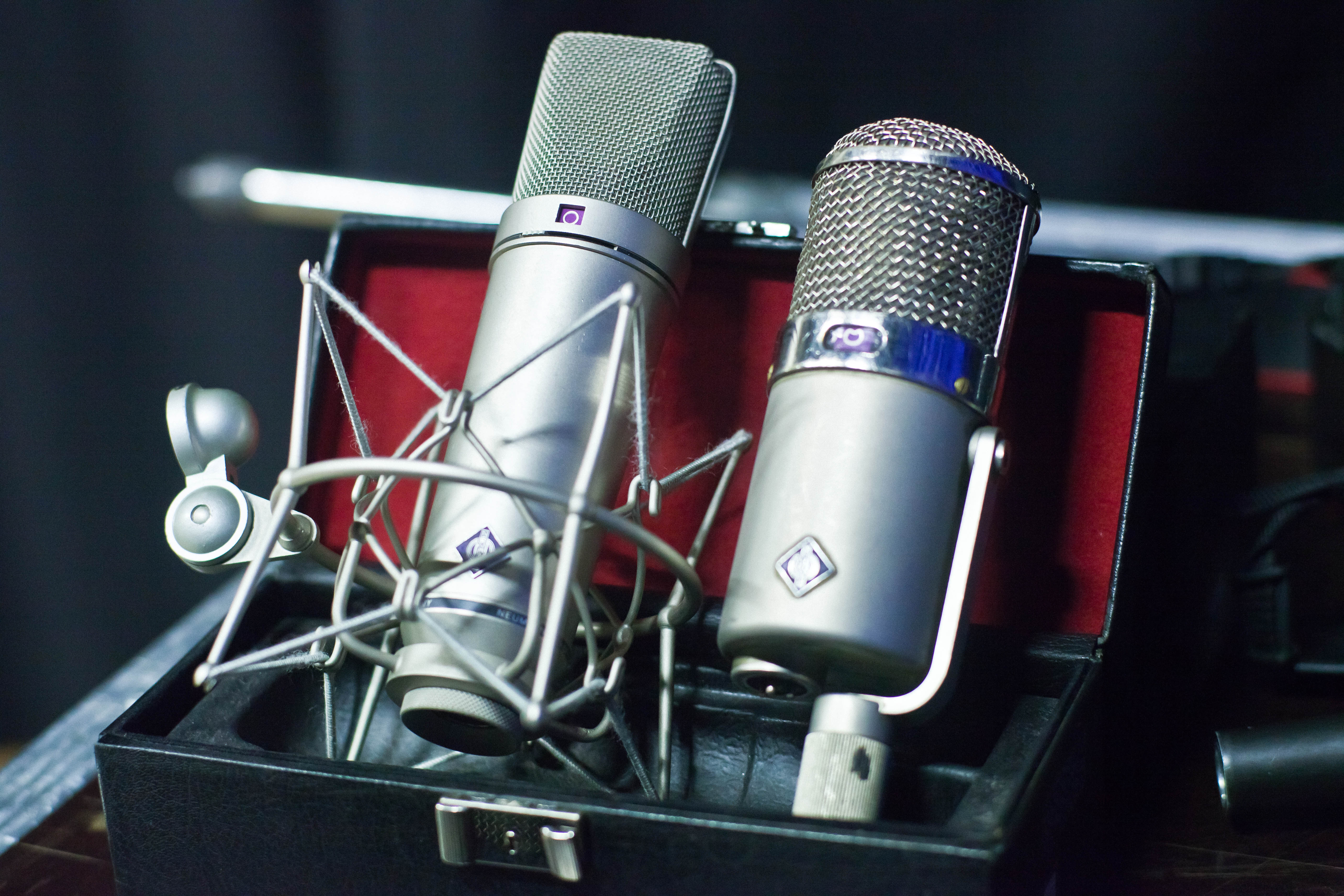
U 87 (left), Neumann's classic of the 1980s and successor of the U 67, with the modern U 47 FET (right).

The U 48, introduced by Neumann late 1957, was identical to the U 47 except for the available polar patterns (cardioid and figure of eight instead of cardioid and omnidirectional). The Beatles' producer George Martin used the U 48 extensively in the group's recordings at Abbey Road Studios, London. As a successor to the U 47, Neumann introduced the U 67 (employing a Telefunken EF 86 tube) in 1960.

In 1967 Neumann introduced the U 87, which was a direct successor to the U 67, but ultimately proved to be (particularly in vocal applications) the most popular successor to the U 47.

The U 47 FET, the solid-state version introduced by Neumann in 1969, was less appreciated as a vocal microphone but became ubiquitous in studios as a bass drum microphone. Used on the outside of the bass drum, in conjunction with a primary bass drum microphone (which would usually be placed on the inside, or close to the inside of a bass drum or a bass drum head), it would make a complete bass drum sound.
