= Microtech Gefell =

German microphone manufacturer

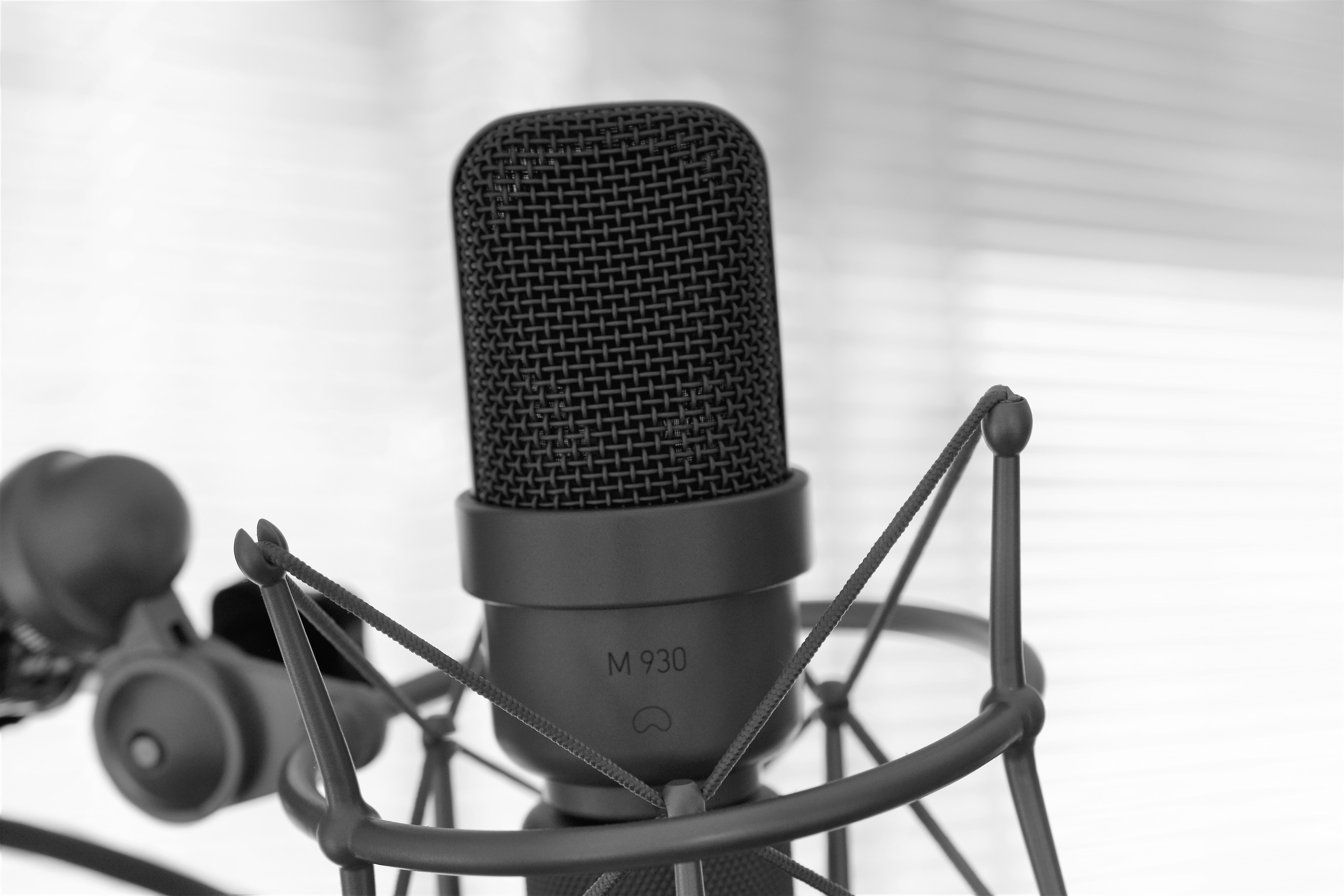
M 930

Founded by Georg Neumann, Microtech Gefell was originally known as Georg Neumann & Company Gefell.

Gefell is the name of the town to which Georg Neumann fled from Berlin in 1943. An incendiary bomb had destroyed most of his original factory earlier that year. He brought his family, his technical director Erich Kühnast, his legal adviser Mr. Drechsler and around 20 employees with him, and soon set up shop in an abandoned textile factory. Production continued in Gefell of the microphone models made since the 1930s in Berlin, including the M7 capsule developed by Walter Weber and Hans Joachim von Braunmuhl of the Reichs-Rundfunk-Gesellschaft. By 1948, Neumann had moved back to his home in Berlin, which was finally relinquished by the military, and started up a new company called Georg Neumann GmbH. When the Berlin Wall was erected in 1961, Neumann's Berlin and Gefell workshops were separated.

In 1972, pressured by the GDR, the company changed its name to VEB Mikrofontechnik Gefell. As a January 2004 Sound on Sound article stated: "Currently under the technical supervision of Kühnast's son, Microtech Gefell still produces the M7 capsule in exactly the same way Georg Neumann taught the elder Kühnast in the 1940s — hand drilling each hole in the backplate, making the PVC membrane, and gluing it all together by hand just as Neumann specified!"

Throughout the GDR period, the Gefell factory grew and supplied measurement and studio microphones to much of the east bloc. The original operation grew to about 160 employees by the late 1980s, and the East German government funded construction of a new building which now houses research and production for measurement and studio microphones. The company is owned by Georg Neumann KG, the descendant of the original firm that was nationalised by the GDR in 1972 and which is now owned by the Kühnast and Drechsler families.

Today the Microtech Gefell factory produces a range of studio and measurement microphones that are sold through distributors worldwide. Three generations of the Kühnast family and two of the Drechsler family are involved in management of the enterprise.

== Sources ==
- "Microtech Gefell 75 Year History"; https://web.archive.org/web/20040502160450/http://www.microtechgefell.de/eng/history/HistoriePDF/E_History%20Microtech%20Gefell%20_pdf.pdf
- Cucoo, Jeremy; "Microtech-Gefell M296"; Recording.org;
- "The History of Microtech Gefell"; Mercenary Audio; https://web.archive.org/web/20070914105604/http://www.mercenary.com/hiofmige.html
- Robjohns, Hugh; "Microtech Gefell M930"; Sound on Sound January 2004; http://www.soundonsound.com/sos/jan04/articles/microtechgefell.htm?print=yes

== See also ==
- List of microphone manufacturers
