= Small nucleolar RNA SNORD87 =

Non-coding RNA in the species Homo sapiens

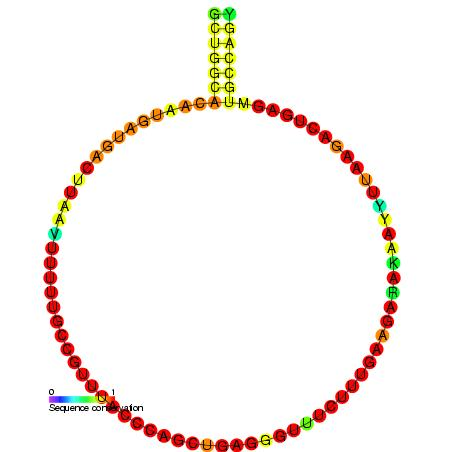
- Predicted secondary structure and sequence conservation of SNORD87

Identifiers
- Symbol: SNORD87
- Alt. Symbols: U87
- Rfam: RF00439

Other data
- RNA type: Gene; snRNA; snoRNA; C/D-box
- Domain: Eukaryota
- GO: GO:0006396 GO:0005730
- SO: SO:0000593
- PDB structures: PDBe

In molecular biology, SNORD87 (also known as U87) is a non-coding RNA (ncRNA) molecule which functions in the modification of other small nuclear RNAs (snRNAs). This type of modifying RNA is usually located in the nucleolus of the eukaryote cell which is a major site of snRNA bio genesis. It is known as a small nucleolar RNA (snoRNA) and also often referred to as a guide RNA.

snoRNA U87 belongs to the C/D box class of snoRNAs which contain the conserved sequence motifs known as the C box (UGAUGA) and the D box (CUGA). Most of the members of the box C/D family function in directing site-specific 2'-O-methylation of substrate RNAs.

U87 was identified by purification from yeast (Saccharomyces cerevisiae) and is the orthologue of mouse MBII-276
