= Gefell =

- Town
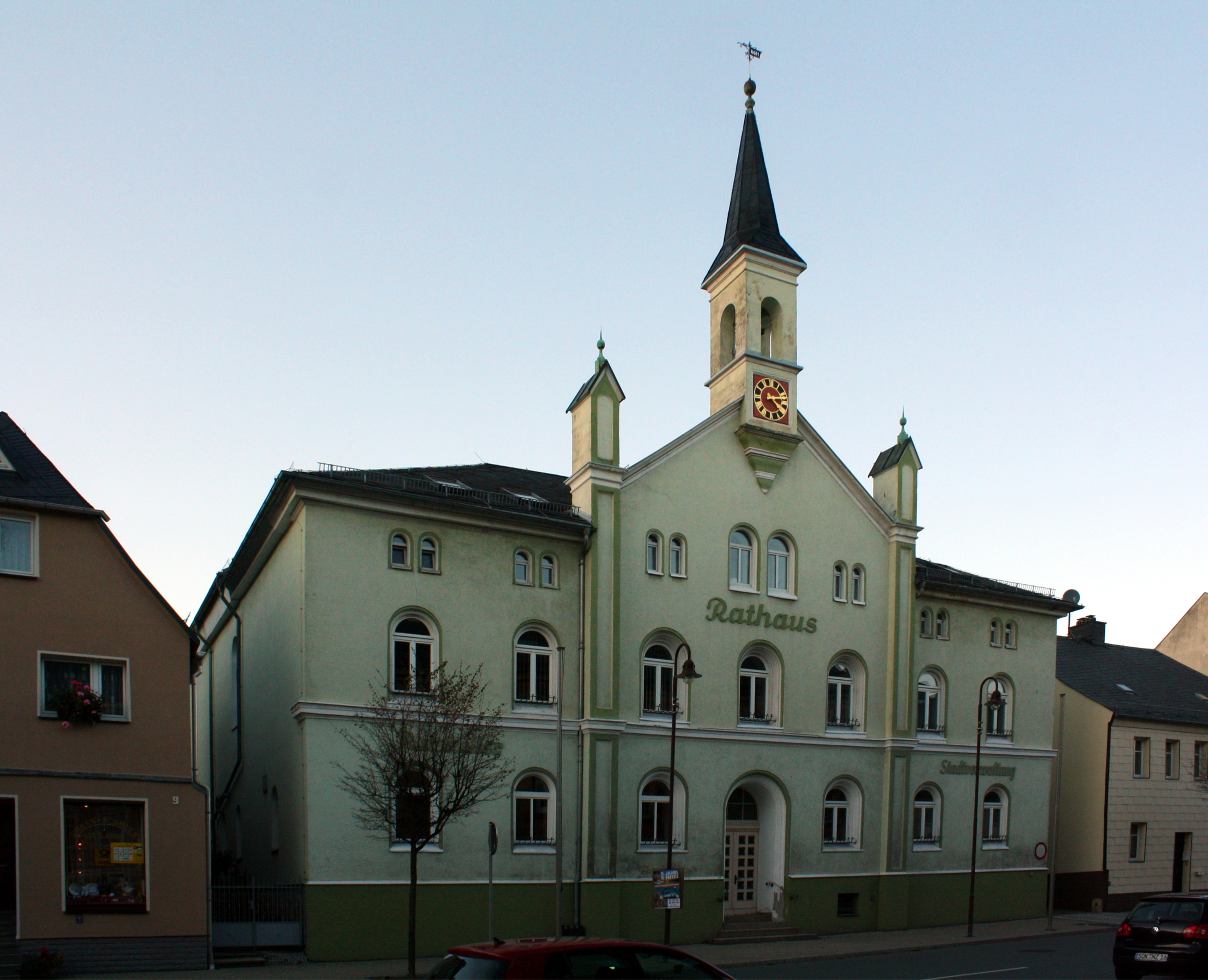
- Town hall

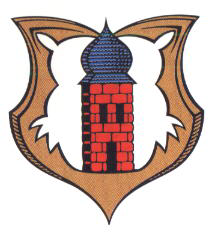
- Coat of arms

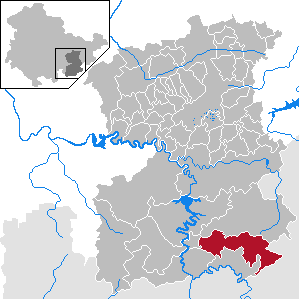
- Location of Gefell within Saale-Orla-Kreis district
- Interactive map of Gefell
- Location within Germany Location within Thuringia
- Coordinates: 50°26′N 11°51′E
- Country: Germany
- State: Thuringia
- District: Saale-Orla-Kreis

Government
  - Mayor (2021–27): Marcel Zapf

Area
  - Total: 45.22 km^{2} (17.46 sq mi)
- Elevation: 550 m (1,800 ft)

Population (2025-12-31)
  - Total: 2,344
  - Density: 51.84/km^{2} (134.3/sq mi)
- Time zone: UTC+01:00 (CET)
  - Summer (DST): UTC+02:00 (CEST)
- Postal codes: 07926
- Dialling codes: 036649
- Vehicle registration: SOK
- Website: Official website

Gefell (German pronunciation: [ɡəˈfɛl]) is a town in the Saale-Orla-Kreis district, in Thuringia, Germany.

== Overview ==
It is situated 16 km south of Schleiz, and 14 km northwest of Hof. It is where the Berlin professional audio company Georg Neumann GmbH relocated during World War II. During the time of the GDR, Gefell was in East Germany and private companies were nationalized, including this factory. Since reunification, the company, now known as Microtech Gefell, has specialized in microphones and is once again privately owned, this time by the families of managers of the pre-war Neumann company.

== See also ==
- Mödlareuth
