= Neumann M 49 =

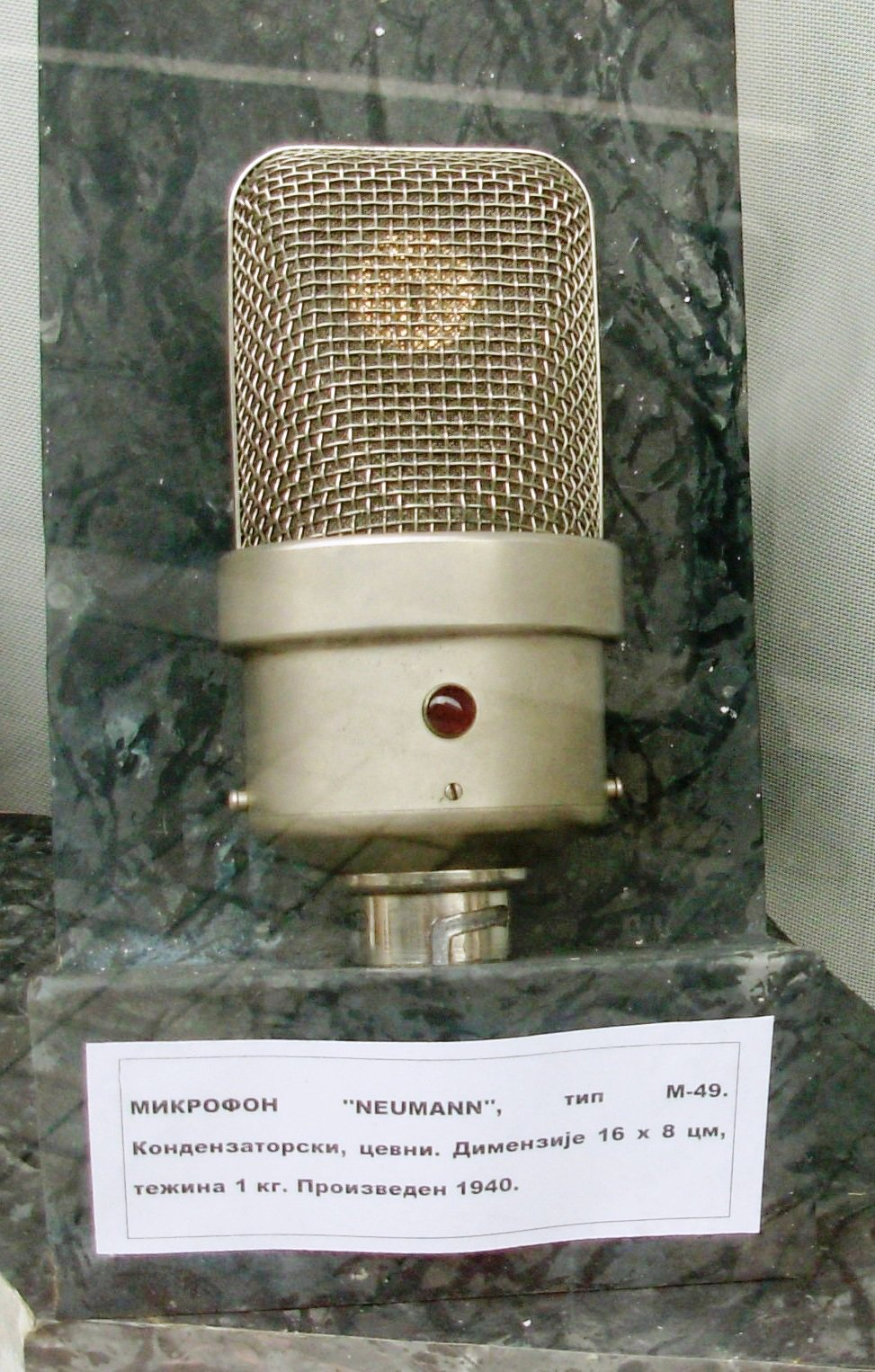
Microphone Neumann M-49 (1940)

The Neumann M49 is a large-diaphragm (acoustics) condenser microphone manufactured by the German company Georg Neumann GmbH. It was the world's first microphone with a remotely switchable polar pattern.

== History ==
The M49 was developed at the Central Laboratory of the Nordwestdeutscher Rundfunk (NWDR) in Hamburg. It was initially designated B-M49, with the "B" standing for the British occupation zone, in which Hamburg was located at the time. Early prototypes featured an unpainted aluminum body and used the MSC2 vacuum tub. Although the patent application was filed in 1949, the microphone was not introduced into German broadcasting studios until 1952.

Production M49 microphones manufactured by Neumann initially used the M7 capsule and later the K49 capsule. In July 2022, Georg Neumann GmbH announced a limited-edition reissue, the M49 V. For this model, production of the K49 capsule resumed after several decades.

Because the M49 employs a pressure-gradient capsule rather than a true pressure transducer, it exhibits proximity effect even when set to the omnidirectional polar pattern, unlike true omnidirectional pressure microphones.
