= Neumann U 87 =

Microphone

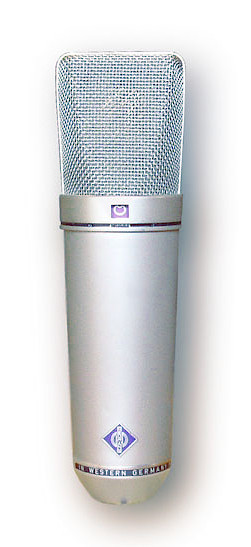
Neumann U 87

The Neumann U 87 is a poly-directional large-diaphragm condenser microphone. Originally introduced in 1967, a version of the U 87 is still produced by Georg Neumann GmbH. The U 87 became an industry standard recording microphone, a reputation that continues to endure.

The U 87 was inducted into the TECnology Hall of Fame in 2006.

== Features ==
The U 87 has a large 25.4 mm diaphragm, and can operate with any one of three selectable polar patterns: cardioid, omnidirectional, or figure-8.

== History ==
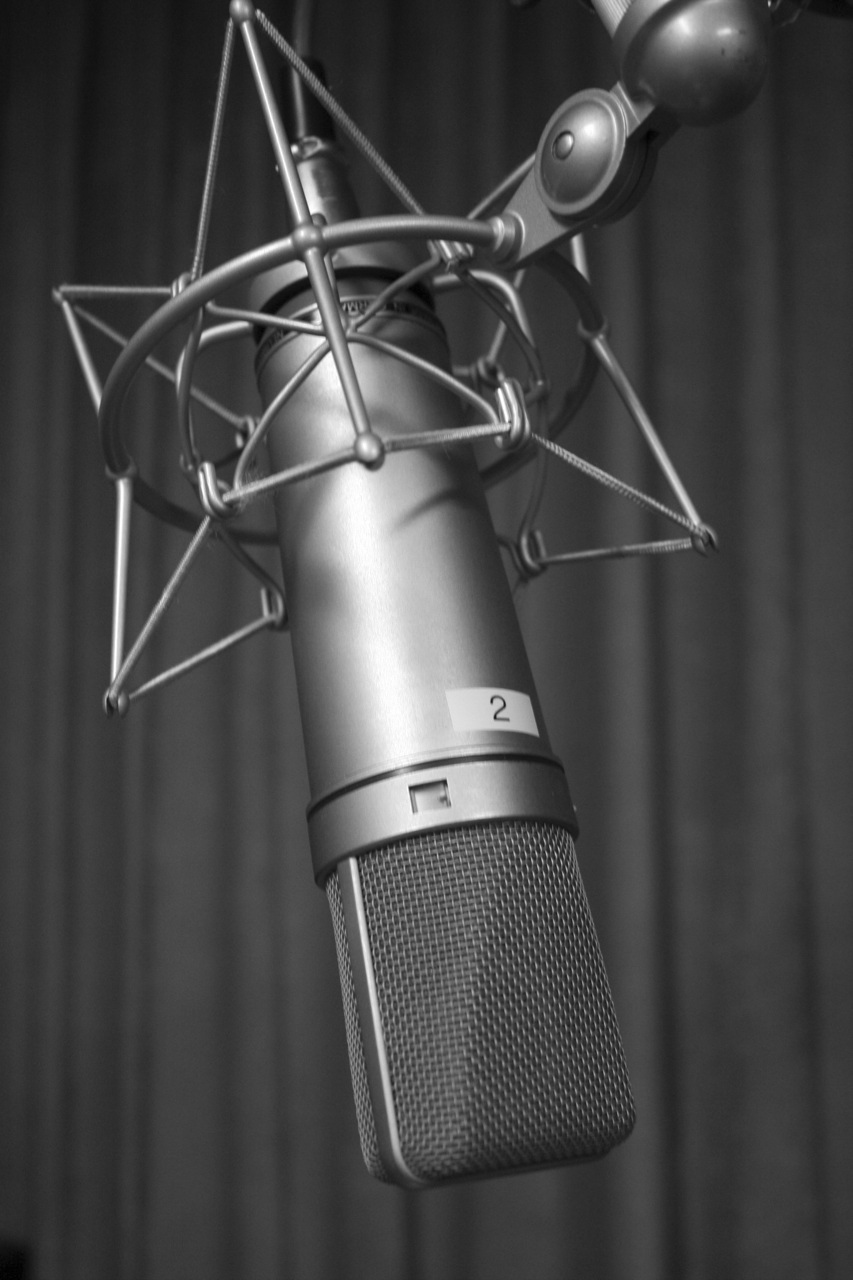
Neumann U 87 with shock mount

Introduced in 1967 as the solid-state successor to the U 67, Neumann introduced the U 87 alongside the KM 86, KM 84, and KM 83 as part of the company's first 'FET 80' series of microphones that utilized use solid-state FET electronics that didn't require separate power supplies or multi-pin power cables and allowed the mics to be made smaller. The U 87 could be powered either by the newly introduced standard of a 48V phantom power supply or two internal 22.5 volt batteries.

The original U 87 used a modified version of the 'K 67' capsule - the 'K 87'. From 1968 to 1974, Neumann also offered the U 77, which worked with AB / Tonader powering (rather than 48V phantom power) or internal 9V battery, and used the same 'K 67' capsule used by the U 67.

In 1986, Neumann introduced the U 87A, which no longer required two 22.5V batteries, and was able to use the same K 67 capsule as the U 67. A version with XLR connector is appended with a lowercase i, i.e. U 87Ai. The updated version had -3 dB lower self-noise, 5-8 mV/Pa higher sensitivity, and 5 dB lower maximum SPL capability.

== In use ==
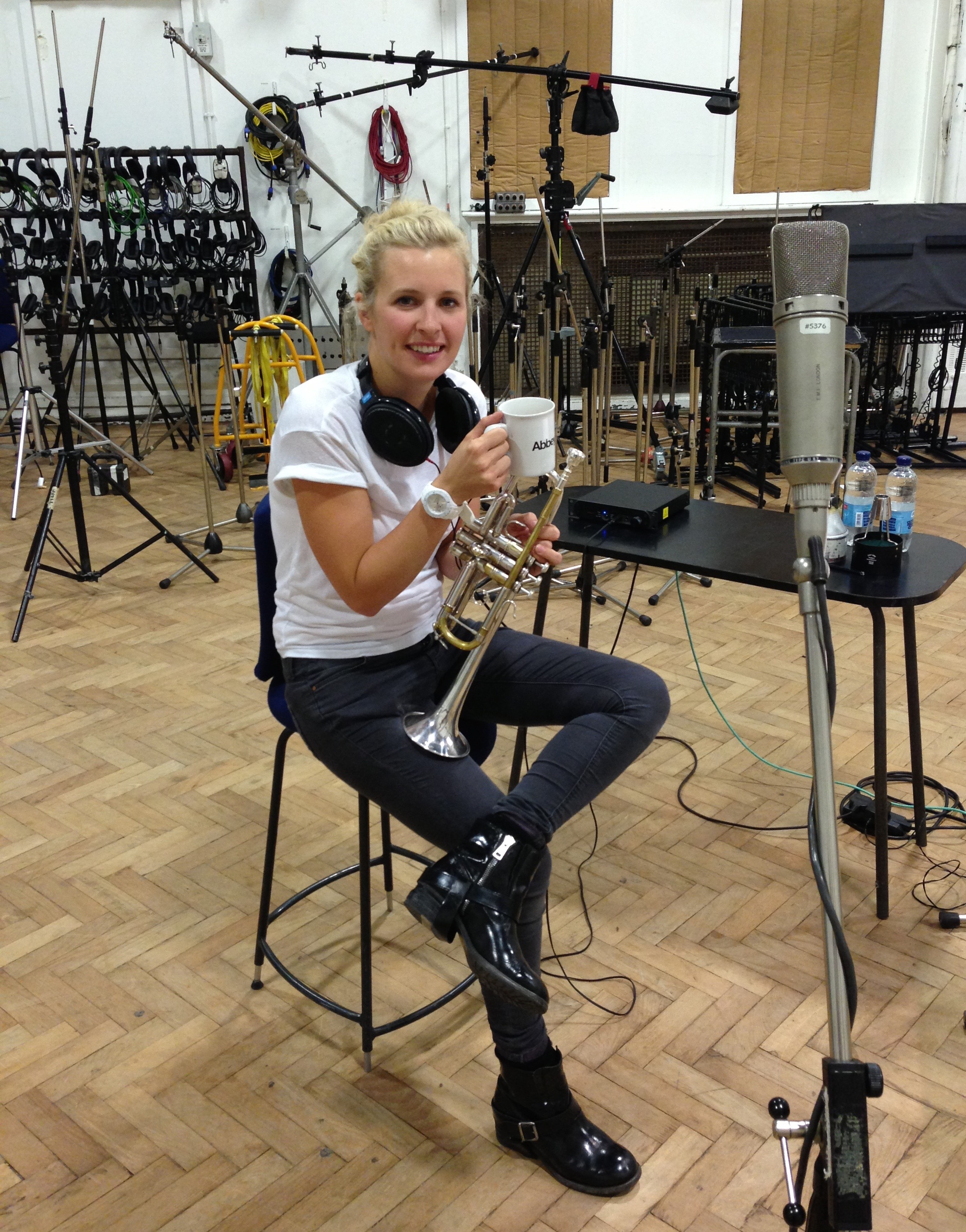
Alison Balsom with a U 87 at Abbey Road Studios (2013)

The U 87 is more often used for vocals, and has been used in the recording of such notable songs as Neil Young's Heart of Gold, Culture Club's "Do You Really Want to Hurt Me", Jimmy Buffett's "Margaritaville", Gary Wright's "Dream Weaver", War's "Low Rider", Paul Davis' "I Go Crazy", Soft Cell's "Tainted Love", Aerosmith's "Walk This Way", Grateful Dead's "Touch of Grey", Talking Heads' "Road to Nowhere", Don McLean's "American Pie", The Doobie Brothers' "What A Fool Believes", Blondie's "The Tide Is High", and Frank Zappa's long-playing album "Lumpy Gravy".

It is also an effective microphone for broadcasters, and has been used by individuals and organizations such as Casey Kasem and NPR.

The U 87 is also popular for micing guitar or instrument amps, or as an overhead microphone.

== See also ==
- Røde NT1
