= Georg Neumann GmbH =

German microphone manufacturer

- Type: Gesellschaft mit beschränkter Haftung
- Founded: 1928
- Founder: Georg Neumann
- Headquarters: Berlin
- Key people: Yasmine Riechers (CEO)
- Parent: Sennheiser electronic GmbH & Co. KG
- Website: neumann.com

Georg Neumann GmbH is a manufacturer of professional recording microphones, preamplifiers, studio monitors, headphones, and audio interfaces. It was founded by Georg Neumann and Erich Rickmann in 1928 and is based in Berlin, Germany. Its best-known products are condenser microphones for recording, broadcast, and live music production purposes. For several decades Neumann was also a leading manufacturer of cutting lathes for phonograph disks, and even ventured into the field of mixing desks.

== History ==
=== Early years ===
The company's original product was the CMV 3. It was a rather large (40 cm tall, 9 cm diameter) microphone with interchangeable capsule heads. Because of its shape and size, this microphone was often known as the "Neumann bottle". It is often seen in historical photographs of public events in Germany through the period of World War II.

Neumann's factory in Berlin was damaged by Allied firebombing in November 1943. Georg Neumann relocated his company to the much smaller town of Gefell in Thuringia and resumed production at the beginning of the following year. At the close of the war, Thuringia fell under Soviet control and the company eventually became an East German "Publicly Owned Operation" (i.e. a state-run enterprise). After the reunification of Germany, the company in Gefell, which had continued to use the Neumann name, became known as Microtech Gefell.

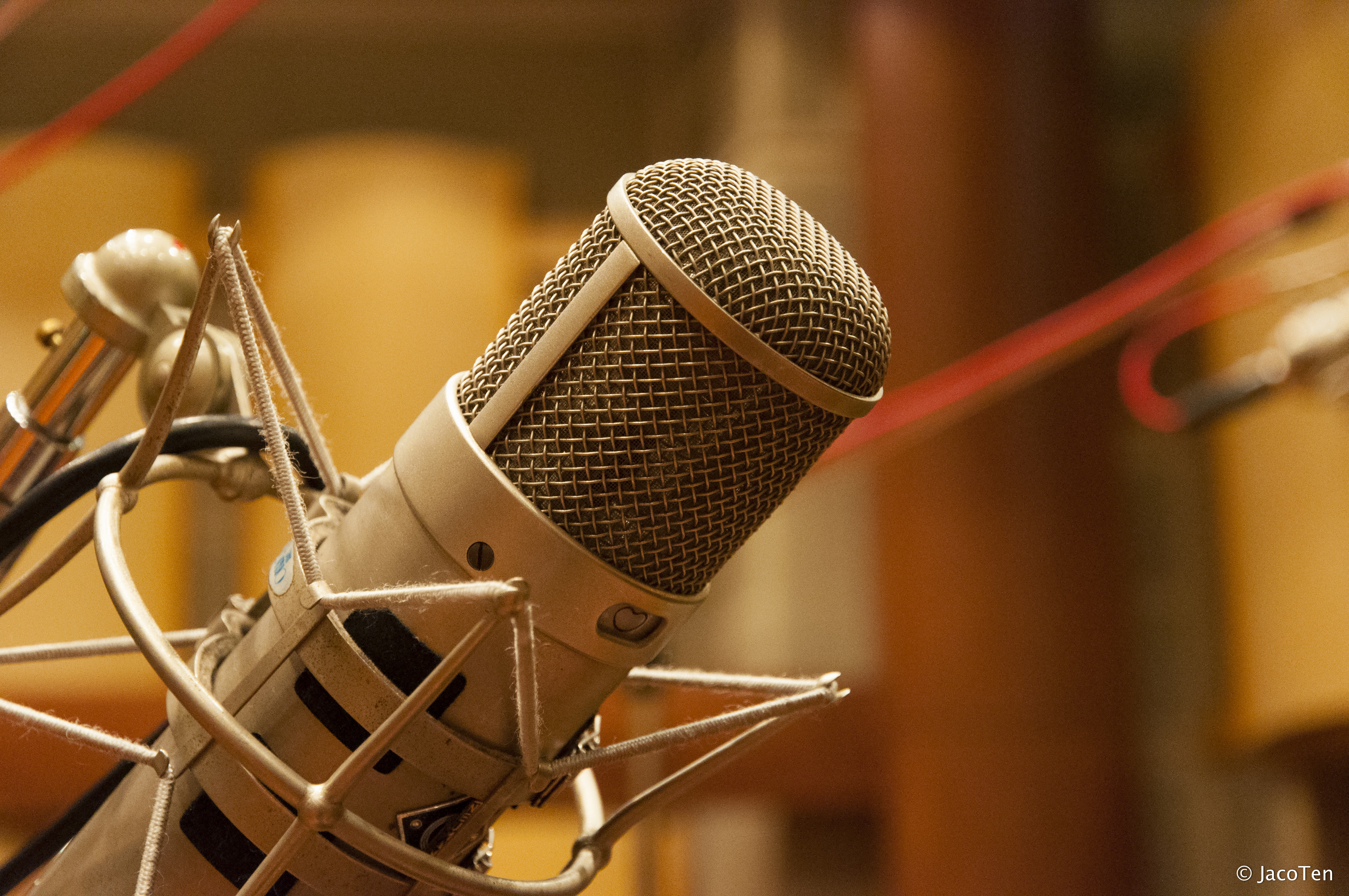
Neumann U 47 Tube

Meanwhile, Georg Neumann re-established his company as "Georg Neumann GmbH" in one of the Allied sectors of Berlin and in 1949 began producing a new model of switchable pattern microphone, the Neumann U 47, based on the M 7 capsule of the earlier CMV 3 series. This microphone was one of the first condenser microphones to gain widespread acceptance in the recording industry worldwide.

In the United States, for example, the sound of the best-known crooners of the 1940s (e.g. Bing Crosby and later Elvis Presley) had utilized the ultra-smooth, rolled-off tone of RCA ribbon microphones; on the other hand, pop recordings in the 1950s (e.g. Frank Sinatra and later the Beatles) were sharper, clearer, and more present as the result of using condenser microphones with elevated upper-mid-range response such as the U 47. The U 47, which was distributed worldwide under the Telefunken brand name, was also used for some early classical orchestral recordings in stereo.

=== Postwar period ===
Other important microphones introduced by Neumann during the immediate postwar period included the M 49 and M 50, both based on designs researched and engineered at the NWDR in Germany. The M 49 used the M 7 capsule in a configuration whose directional pattern was remotely controlled, the first microphone to offer such a feature. The M 50 featured a small, diffuse-field equalized pressure transducer embedded in the surface of a 40 mm hard plastic sphere, which gave it increasing directionality above the mid-range frequencies. The company also produced equipment for electroacoustic measurement, including calibrated measurement microphones and chart recorders.

During the period from 1953 to 1956 Neumann introduced a series of small condenser microphones (KM 53, 54 and 56) especially for use in television broadcast studios. In 1957 they introduced the SM 2 microphone, which was essentially a pair of KM 56 microphones in a single body, arranged so that their directional patterns could be controlled remotely. The SM 2 was the world's first stereo microphone.

=== End of the 1950s ===
At the end of the 1950s, the Telefunken VF 14 vacuum tube on which the circuitry of the U 47 and U 48 had been based, was discontinued, so Neumann came under pressure to develop a successor. They decided to offer all three of those two models' directional patterns in a single microphone. In the meantime, the rock 'n' roll era had begun and some engineers were recording loud vocals with singers singing directly into microphones at very close range; when the U 47 or U 48 were used in this way, the result was considered by many engineers at the time to sound unacceptably harsh. (This could be considered ironic, since the U 47 and U 48 have a cult following today specifically for use in close-up vocals, with some engineers seeming to fancy that they are re-creating a "vintage" sound—whereas in fact, they are creating a sound quality that was specifically abhorred by many of the "golden ears" of the era—notable exceptions being Beatles producer George Martin and engineers Norman Smith and Geoff Emerick.) The result was the U 67, a microphone with less emphasis in its upper midrange response, giving it less of a "forward" tone color. The U 67 uses a new capsule, the K 67. Unlike the K 47, the K 67 utilizes a two-piece backplate, allowing the diaphragms to be tuned separately and then matched to achieve the same front/rear response.

=== 1960s ===
In 1964 Neumann developed a small cardioid capsule with considerably improved off-axis linearity; it was used in the KM 64 and U 64 microphones.

In 1965 Neumann began to introduce solid-state microphones. The first model was the KTM small cardioid, later followed by the "fet 70" series—transistorized versions of small omnidirectional, cardioid and speech cardioid microphones as well as a "U 77" transistorized version of the U 67. This series used the 12-volt A-B powering system (parallel powering, T-power or "Tonaderspeisung") as found in Nagra tape recorders, and was therefore incompatible with existing studio power supplies. However, standard two-conductor shielded cables (as were commonly used for dynamic microphones) could now be used for connecting condenser microphones as well, obviating the need for special multi-conductor cables.

In 1966 Neumann adapted the "phantom powering" method that had been used for years in certain telephone systems, so that a compatible method of powering would allow tube microphones, solid-state microphones and dynamic microphones all to be connected to the same power supplies. Eventually the "fet 80" series grew to include over a dozen models, some of which are still in production as of 2018—the U 87, U 89, KMR 81, KMR 82 and USM 69. The best-known models from this series were the KM 84 small diaphragm cardioid and the U 87 three-pattern, large diaphragm successor to the U 67.

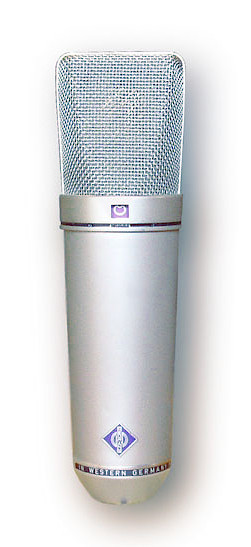
U 87 microphone

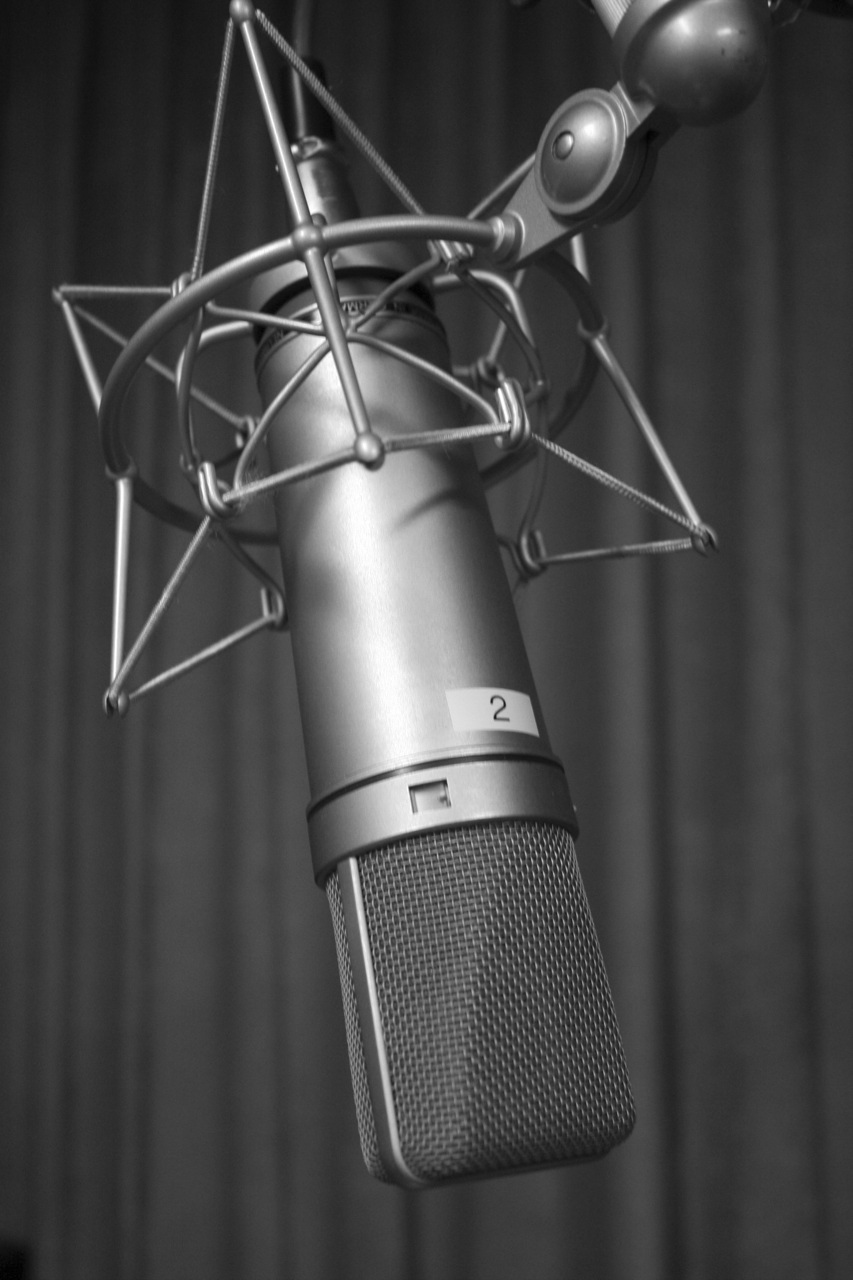
U 87 microphone

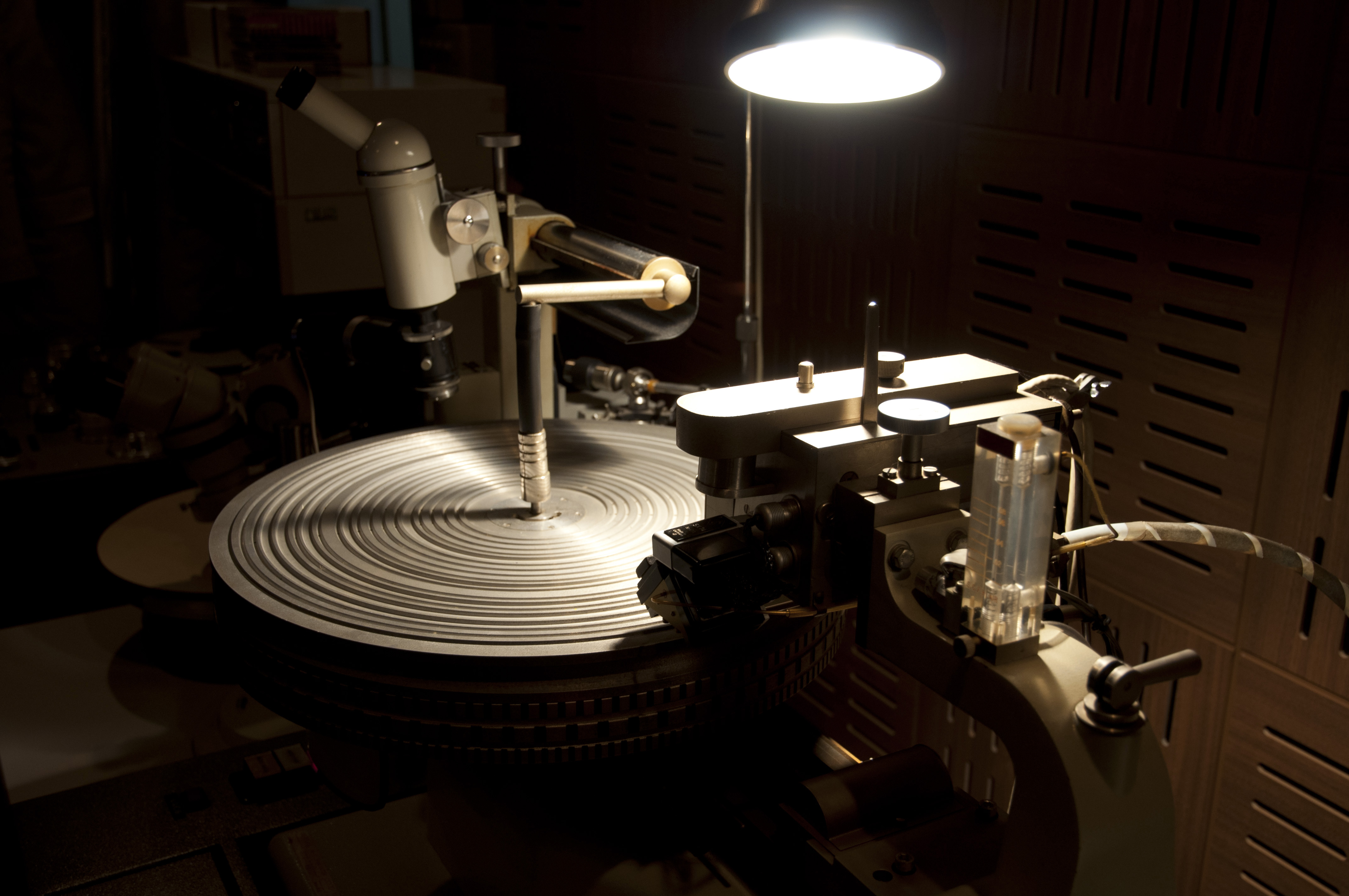
Neumann VMS70 disc cutting lathe

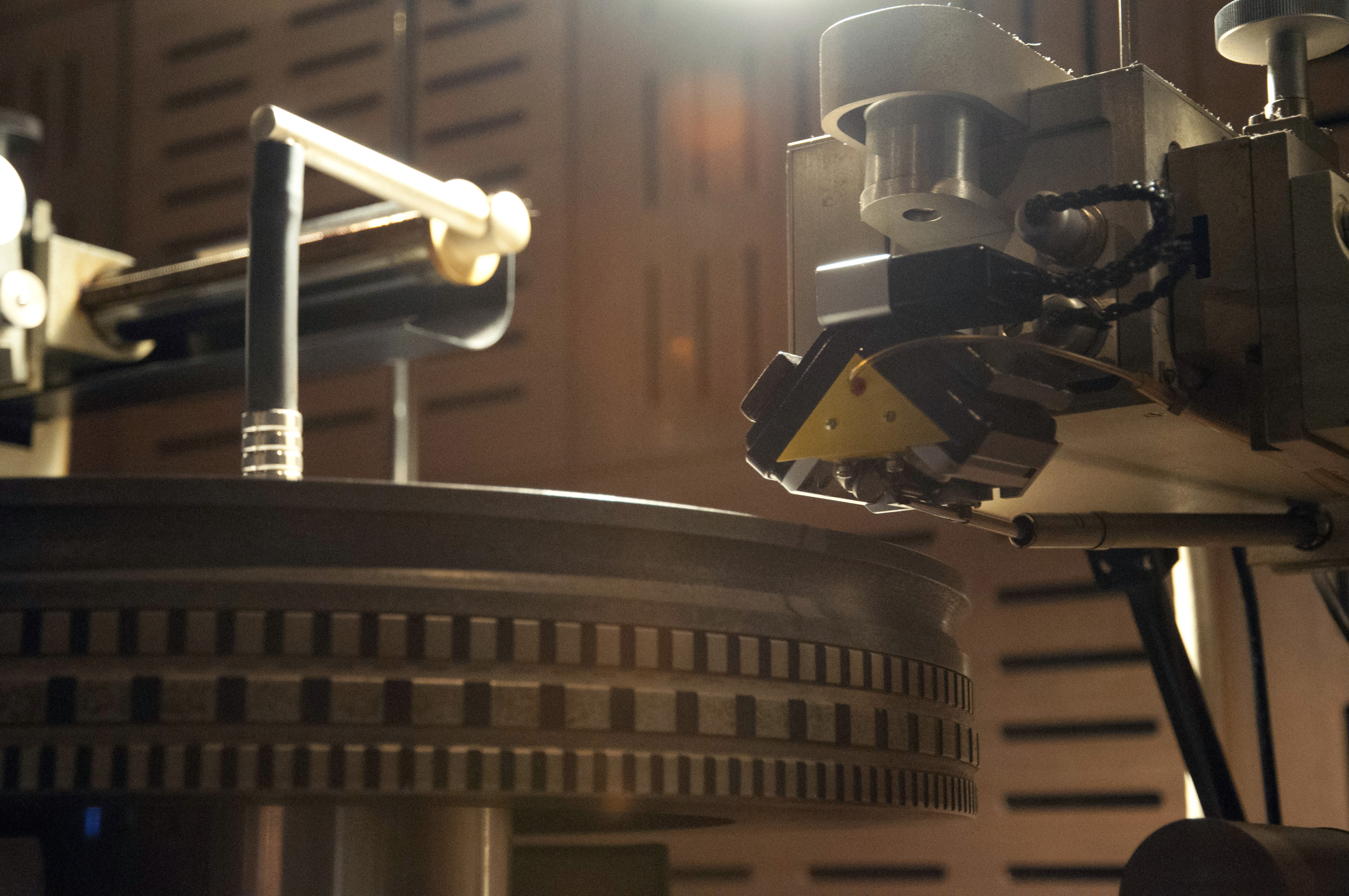
Neumann VMS70 disc cutting lathe with SX74 cutter head

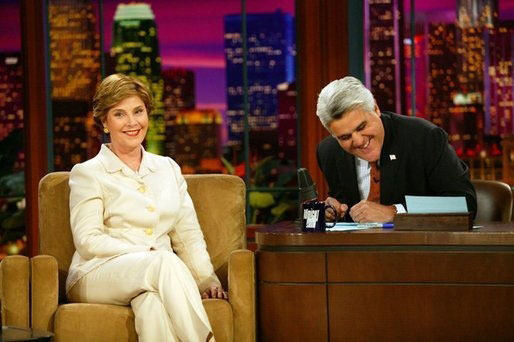
Laura Bush with Jay Leno and a Neumann TLM 103 in 2004

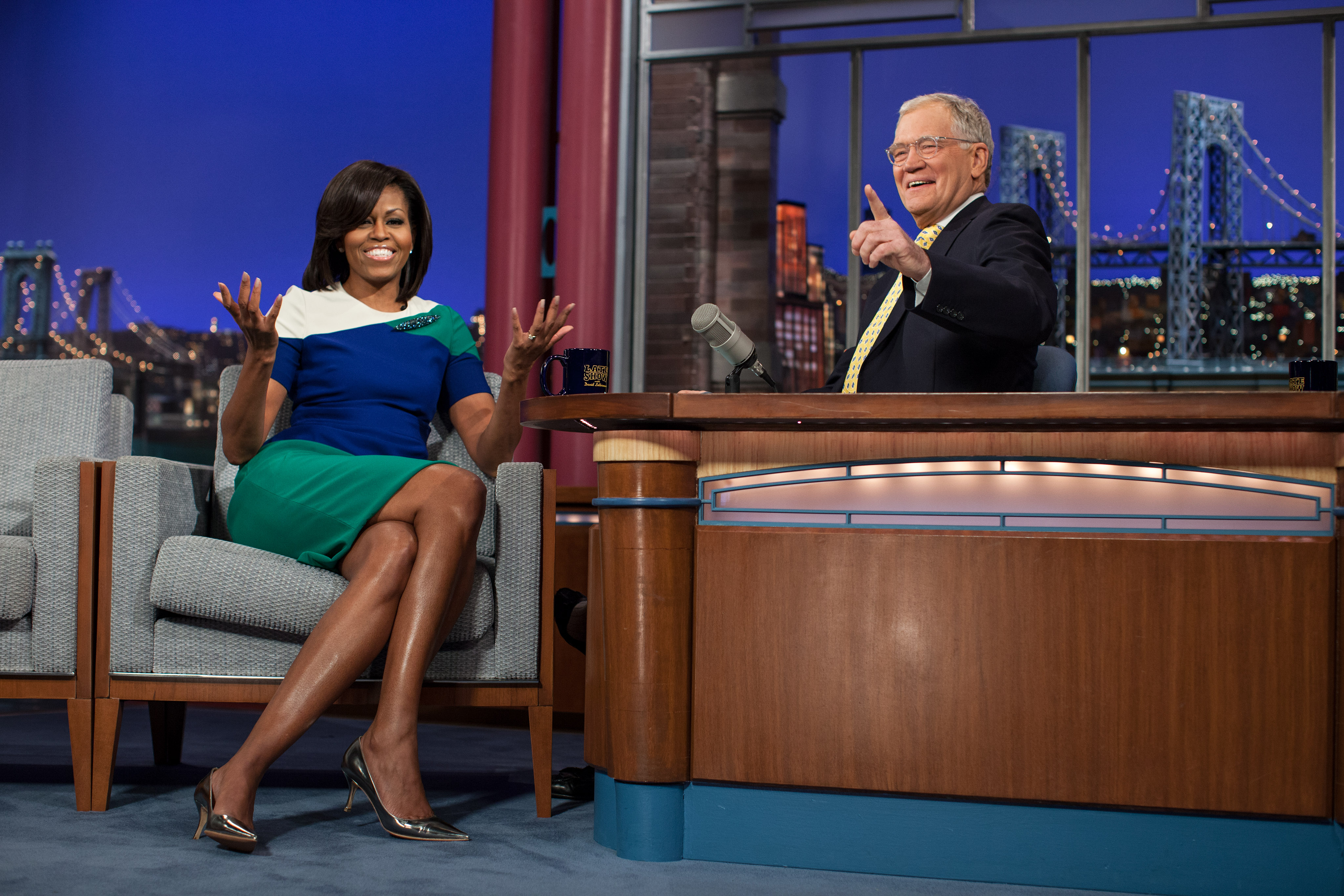
Michelle Obama with David Letterman and a Neumann M 147 in 2012

=== 1980s and after ===
In 1983 Neumann began to introduce microphones with balanced outputs but no output transformer, starting with the model TLM 170. Eventually this "fet 100" or "transformerless" series was expanded to include the KM 100 modular series of small microphones (with seven different "active capsules" for various directional patterns), the cardioid TLM 193 (using the capsule of the U 89 and TLM 170), the small-diaphragm KM 180 series, the large-diaphragm cardioid TLM 103, the variable-pattern TLM 127 and the TLM 49 cardioid vocal microphone.

Neumann was acquired by Sennheiser Electronic GmbH in 1991. Production of Neumann microphones was moved into a newly-built level 100 cleanroom factory in Wedemark, near Hanover. The company maintains its official headquarters in Berlin.

Beginning in 1995 the company introduced a series of vacuum tube microphones with transformerless output circuitry: the multi-pattern M 149 Tube, the cardioid M 147 Tube, and the omnidirectional M 150 Tube (based on the classic M 50 design, with the pressure transducer mounted in the surface of a sphere inside the capsule head).

In 2003 Neumann introduced their first microphone with built-in analog-to-digital conversion, the Solution-D D-01. In 2006, the D-01 was followed with a modular, small-diaphragm series of digital microphones, KM D, based on the KM 100/180 series.

In 2005, Neumann began production of its first dynamic microphone, the BCM 705, for the broadcast industry.

In 2010, Neumann introduced the "KH Line" of studio monitors, based on products from Klein + Hummel, a company from Stuttgart founded by Horst Klein and Walter Hummel in 1945, and acquired by Sennheiser in 2005.

In 2019 their first headphones were introduced, the NDH 20. In 2020, Ralf Oehl became CEO of the company. In March 2024, Yasmine Riechers was appointed CEO of the company.

== See also ==
- List of microphone manufacturers
- List of studio monitor manufacturers
