= Field-sequential color system =

Color television system

A field-sequential color system (FSC) is a color television system in which the primary color information is transmitted in successive images and which relies on the human vision system to fuse the successive images into a color picture. One field-sequential system was developed in 1940 by Guillermo González Camarena (US2296019A patent). The Federal Communications Commission adopted it on October 11, 1950, as the standard for color television in the United States. Its regular broadcast debut was on June 25, 1951. However, a few months later, CBS ended color broadcasting on October 20, 1951. In March 1953, CBS withdrew its color system as a standard, creating an opening for all-electronic color systems from other manufacturers.

In the late 1960s, NASA revived the Goldmark-CBS system to broadcast color video from Project Apollo Command Modules, using a camera developed by Westinghouse Electric Corporation. The Westinghouse color camera was adapted to eventually broadcast from the lunar surface itself. Starting with Apollo 10, in May 1969, sequential color TV cameras flew on all NASA human spaceflight missions until the late 1980s, when CCD-based cameras replaced them. After the turn of the 21st century, consumer Digital Light Processing (DLP) projectors use a single chip and produce color by the sequential color process, using a color wheel for both front and rear projectors.

== Predecessor inventions ==
According to television historian Albert Abramson, A. A. Polumordvinov invented the first field-sequential color system. Polumordvinov applied for his Russian patent 10738 in 1899. This system scanned images with two rotating cylinders. A later German patent by A. Frankenstein and Werner von Jaworski described another field-sequential system. Like the CBS System, this patent included a color wheel. Frankenstein and Jaworski applied for their patent 172376 in 1904.

John Logie Baird demonstrated a version of field-sequential color television on July 3, 1928, using a mechanical television system before his use of cathode ray tubes, and producing a vertical color image about 4 inches (10 cm) high. It was described in the journal Nature:

The process consisted of first exploring the object, the image of which is to be transmitted, with a spot of red light, next with a spot of green light, and finally with a spot of blue light. At the receiving station a similar process is employed, red, blue and green images being presented in rapid success to the eye. The apparatus used at the transmitter consists of a disc perforated with three successive spiral curves of holes. The holes in the first spiral are covered with red filters, in the second with green filters and in the third with blue. Light is projected through these holes and an image of the moving holes is projected onto the object. The disc revolves at 10 revolutions per second and so thirty complete images are transmitted every second—ten blue, ten red, and ten green.

At the receiving station a similar disc revolves synchronously with the transmitting disc, and behind this disc, in line with the eye of the observer, are two glow discharge lamps. One of these lamps is a neon tube and the other a tube containing mercury vapor and helium. By means of a commutator the mercury vapor and helium tube is placed in circuit for two-thirds of a revolution and the neon tube for the remaining third. The red light from the neon is accentuated by placing red filters over the view holes for the red image. Similarly, the view holes corresponding to the green and blue images are covered by suitable filters. The blue and green lights both come from the mercury helium tube, which emits light rich in both colors.

Baird demonstrated a modified two-color version in February 1938, using a red and blue-green filter arrangement in the transmitter; on July 27, 1939 he further demonstrated that colour scanning system in combination with a cathode ray tube with filter wheel as the receiver. By December 1940 he had publicly demonstrating a 600 line version of the system.

== Goldmark-CBS field-sequential color system ==
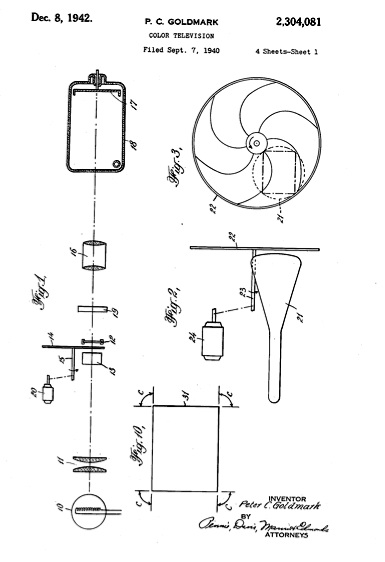
Patent diagrams of CBS field-sequential color system: Fig. 1 the transmission system, Fig. 2 the receiving system, Fig. 3 the color filter disk.

=== System description ===
The CBS field-sequential system was an example of a mechanical television system because it relied in part on a disc of color filters rotating at 1440 rpm inside the camera and the receiver, capturing and displaying red, green, and blue television images in sequence. The field rate was increased from 60 to 144 fields per second to overcome the flicker from the separate color images, resulting in 24 complete color frames per second (each of the three colors was scanned twice, double interlacing being standard for all electronic television: 2 scans × 3 colors × 24 frames per second = 144 fields per second), instead of the standard 30 frames/60 fields per second of monochrome. If the 144-field color signal were transmitted with the same detail as a 60-field monochrome signal, 2.4 times the bandwidth would be required. Therefore, to keep the signal within the standard 6-MHz bandwidth of a channel, the image's vertical resolution was reduced from 525 lines to 405. The vertical resolution was 77% of monochrome, and the horizontal resolution was 54% of monochrome.

Because of these variances in resolution and frame rate from the NTSC standards for television broadcasting, field-sequential color broadcasts could not be seen on existing black and white receivers without an adapter (to see them in monochrome), or adapter-converter (to see them in color).

=== Commercial failure ===
The CBS Sequential Color TV system was first demonstrated to the press on September 4, 1940. A color 16mm film was telecined to a color TV set and shown to the gathered press in Peter Goldmark's New York CBS lab. Live color from television cameras in a studio was first demonstrated to the press in 1941. The system was first shown to the general public on January 12, 1950.

The Federal Communications Commission adopted the CBS color system as the standard for color television in the United States on October 11, 1950. Public tests started in November 1950. CBS Television began regular, seven-day-a-week color broadcasting on June 25, 1951, in the New York City area, with a one-hour variety show hosted by Arthur Godfrey.

In June 1951, Philco offered 11 television models that could show CBS color broadcasts in black and white. CBS purchased its own television manufacturer in April 1951 when no other company would produce color sets using the system. Production of CBS-Columbia color receivers began in September and were first offered for retail sale in October. Field-sequential color broadcasts were suspended by CBS on October 20, 1951 after showing the University of North Carolina versus the University of Maryland college football game.

The cessation of color broadcasts and selling color TV sets came about mostly by the request of the National Production Authority (NPA), which prohibited the manufacture of color sets for the general public during the Korean War. Allen B. DuMont, owner of the DuMont Television Network, suspected that the reason CBS capitulated so easily was because of the complete lack of public interest in non-compatible color TV, and the NPA being a good excuse to cut costs and end what was a money-losing business. Only 200 color sets had been manufactured for commercial sale, and only 100 of those had shipped, when CBS suspended its color broadcasts. CBS announced in March 1953 that it had abandoned any further plans for its color system.

Meanwhile, RCA continued working on and improving its NTSC compatible color television system, first demonstrated in 1949. By spring 1953, RCA developed an all-electronic color TV system that the NTSC adopted. NTSC compatible color superseded the field-sequential system as the color TV standard for the United States when the FCC approved it for public use on December 17, 1953.

== Westinghouse lunar color camera ==
=== Choosing a color process ===
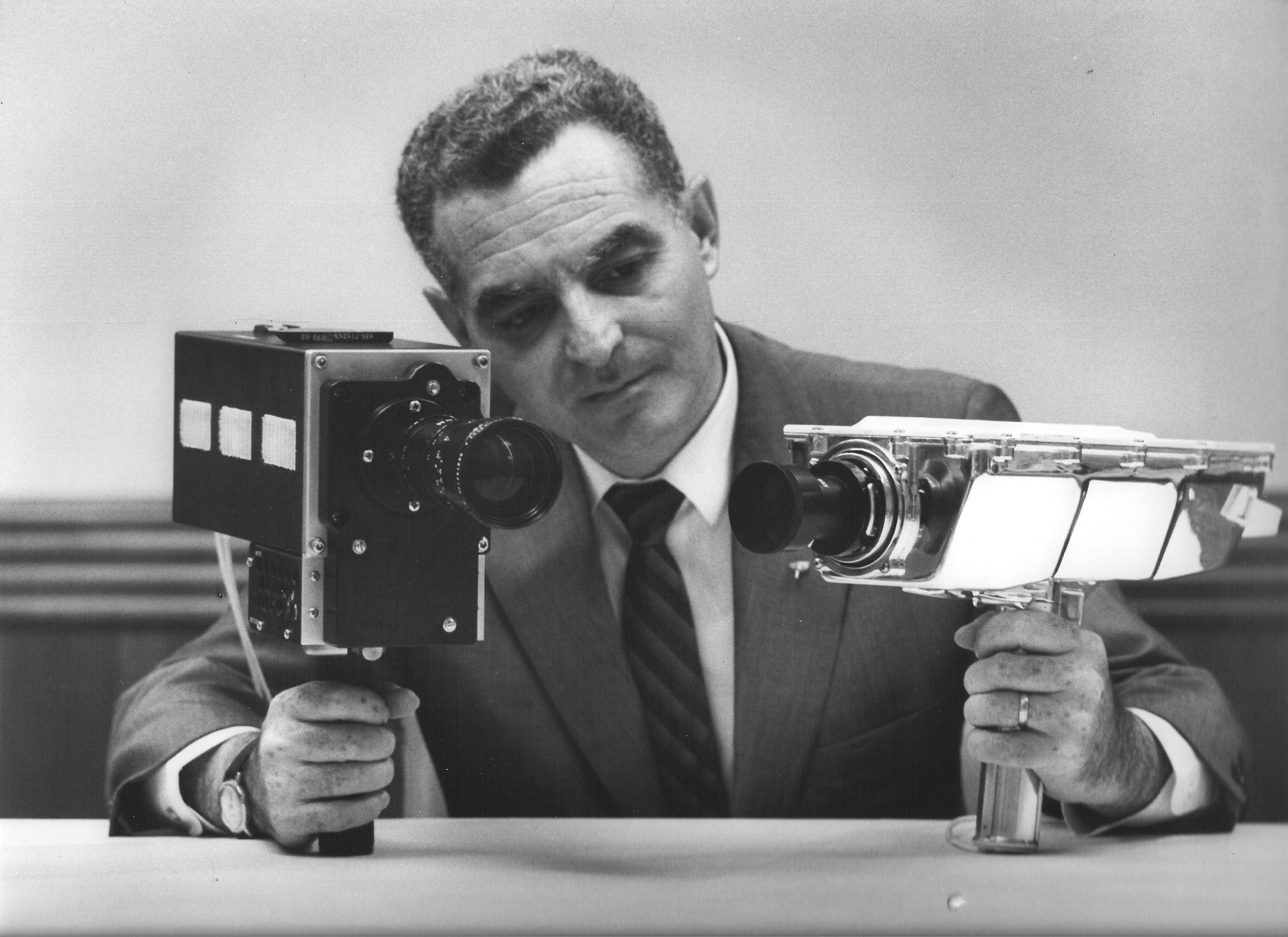
Stan Lebar, the project manager for Westinghouse's Apollo television cameras, shows the field-sequential color camera on the left and the monochrome lunar surface camera on the right.

Color broadcast studio television cameras in the 1960s, such as the RCA TK-41, were large, heavy and high in energy consumption. They used three imaging tubes to generate red, green and blue (RGB) video signals which were combined to produce a composite color picture. These cameras required complex optics to keep the tubes aligned. Since temperature variations and vibration would easily put a three-tube system out of alignment, a more robust system was needed for lunar surface operations.

In the 1940s, CBS Laboratories invented an early color system that utilized a wheel, containing six color filters, rotated in front of a single video camera tube to generate the RGB signal. Called a field-sequential color system, it used interlaced video, with sequentially alternating color video fields to produce one complete video frame. That meant that the first field would be red, the second blue, and the third field green – matching the color filters on the wheel. This system was both simpler and more reliable than a standard three-tube color camera, and more power-efficient.

=== The camera ===
Stanley Lebar and his Westinghouse team wanted to add color to their camera as early as 1967, and they knew that the CBS system would likely be the best system to study. The Westinghouse lunar color camera used a modified version of CBS's field-sequential color system. A color wheel, with six filter segments, was placed behind the lens mount. It rotated at 9.99 revolutions per second, producing a scan rate of 59.94 fields per second, the same as NTSC video. Synchronization between the color wheel and pickup tube's scan rate was provided by a magnet on the wheel, which controlled the sync pulse generator that governed the tube's timing.

The color camera used the same SEC video imaging tube as the monochrome lunar camera flown on Apollo 9. The camera was larger, measuring 430 millimetres (17 in) long, including the new zoom lens. The zoom lens had a focal length variable from 25 mm to 150 mm, i.e. a zoom ratio of 6:1. At its widest angle, it had a 43-degree field of view, while in its extreme telephoto mode, it had a 7-degree field of view. The aperture ranged from F4 to F44, with a T5 light transmittance rating.

=== Color decoding and signal processing ===
Signal processing was needed at the Earth receiving ground stations to compensate for the Doppler effect, caused by the spacecraft moving away from or towards the Earth. The Doppler Effect would distort color, so a system that employed two videotape recorders (VTRs), with a tape-loop delay to compensate for the effect, was developed. The cleaned signal was then transmitted to Houston in NTSC-compatible black and white. (Note: The unprocessed signal from the Moon, with its fluctuating TV synchronization signals, was sent to the first VTR and was recorded on 2-inch tape. The tape was not spooled on that machine, but instead, was played back on the second VTR, using the steady house sync signal to play it back and fix any synchronization issues caused by the Doppler effect (this time base correction is now accomplished by digital methods since the mid-1970s).)

Unlike the CBS system that required a special mechanical receiver on a TV set to decode the color, the signal was decoded in Houston's Mission Control Center. This video processing occurred in real time. The decoder separately recorded each red, blue and green field onto an analog magnetic disk recorder. Acting as a framebuffer, it then sent the coordinated color information to an encoder to produce a NTSC color video signal and then released to the broadcast pool feed. Once the color was decoded, scan conversion was not necessary, because the color camera ran at the same 60-fields-per-second video interlace rate as the NTSC standard.

=== Operational history ===
It was first used on the Apollo 10 mission. The camera used the command module's extra S-band channel and large S-band antenna to accommodate the camera's larger bandwidth. It was only used in the lunar module when it was docked to the command module. Unlike the earlier cameras, it contained a portable video monitor that could be either directly attached to the camera or float separately. Combined with the new zoom lens, it allowed the astronauts to have better precision with their framing.

Apollo 12 was the first mission to use the color camera on the lunar surface. About 42 minutes into telecasting the first EVA, astronaut Alan Bean inadvertently pointed the camera at the Sun while preparing to mount it on the tripod. The Sun's extreme brightness burned out the video pickup tube, rendering the camera useless. When the camera was returned to Earth, it was shipped to Westinghouse, and they were able to get an image on the section of the tube that wasn't damaged. Procedures were re-written in order to prevent such damage in the future, including the addition of a lens cap to protect the tube when the camera was repositioned off the MESA.

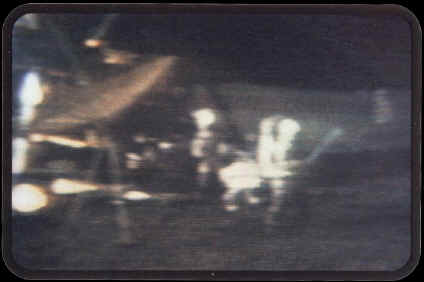
Apollo 14 EVA frame demonstrates the "blooming" issue with color camera.

The color camera successfully covered the lunar operations during the Apollo 14 mission in 1971. Image quality issues appeared due to the camera's automatic gain control (AGC) having problems getting the proper exposure when the astronauts were in high contrast light situations, and caused the white spacesuits to be overexposed or "bloom". The camera did not have a gamma correction circuit. This resulted in the image's mid-tones losing detail.

After Apollo 14, it was only used in the command module, as the new RCA-built camera replaced it for lunar surface operations. The Westinghouse color camera continued to be used throughout the 1970s on all three Skylab missions and the Apollo–Soyuz Test Project.

The 1969–1970 Emmy Awards for Outstanding Achievement in Technical/Engineering Development were awarded to NASA for the conceptual aspects of the color Apollo television camera and to Westinghouse Electric Corporation for the development of the camera.

== Later use ==
For the first nine months of NTSC color in 1953–1954, CBS continued to use its field-sequential color television cameras, with the field rate and signal adapted for NTSC standards, until RCA delivered its first production model of an NTSC color camera in time for the 1954–55 season.

The Soviet Union was the only other country to experiment with a field-sequential color system. It manufactured a small number of color receivers in 1954 that used a mechanical color disc.

Modern day Digital Light Processing (DLP) projectors commonly use color wheels to generate color images, typically running at a multiple of the video frame rate.

== See also ==
- NTSC – Broadcast system that encodes color information into a compatible signal
- PAL and SECAM – Broadcast system that sends color information sequentially by scan line
- Mechanical television
- Guillermo González Camarena – Chromoscopic adapter for television
- History of television
- Penetron – a color CRT system that used field-sequential color
