= CBS Laboratories =

Defunct American technology R&D company owned by CBS

CBS Laboratories Logo

CBS Laboratories or CBS Labs (later known as the CBS Technology Center or CTC) was the technology research and development organization of the CBS television network. Innovations developed at the labs included many groundbreaking broadcast, industrial, military, and consumer technologies.

== History and significant technological achievements ==
CBS Labs in Stamford, CT

CBS Laboratories was established in 1936 in New York City to conduct technological research for CBS and outside clients. In October 1957, CBS President Dr. Frank Stanton, speaking during the ground-breaking ceremonies for a new CBS Laboratories building in Stamford, Connecticut said: "Our objective in establishing the Laboratories is to continue CBS leadership in communications and electronics and provide broader research and development services."

One year later, a group of 60 engineers and scientists, led by Dr. Peter Goldmark, left New York City and moved into the new 30,000 square-foot facility. The results of their efforts over the next 20 years resulted in a steady growth in facilities, personnel, sales, product development and technological leadership.

Laboratory facilities grew to include five well-equipped buildings totaling more than 200,000 square feet. Six major departments were engaged in a wide range of research and development programs for government, industry, education, medicine and the broadcasting field.

The total staff grew to more than 600 people, one-third of whom were professionals. Many of these professionals were internationally renowned in their respective fields and helped establish CBS Laboratories as a leader in electronics and communications research and development.

Dr. Peter Goldmark joined CBS Laboratories in 1936. On September 4, 1940, while working at the lab, he demonstrated the Field-Sequential Color TV system. It utilized a mechanical color wheel on both the camera and on the television home receiver, but was not compatible with the existing post-war NTSC, 525-line, 60-field/second black and white TV sets as it was a 405-line, 144-field scanning system. It was the first color broadcasting system that received FCC approval in 1950, and the CBS Television Network began broadcasting in color on November 20, 1950. However, no other TV set manufacturers made the sets, and CBS stopped broadcasting in field-sequential color on October 21, 1951.

Nevertheless, the Field Sequential Color System was selected to televise the real-time broadcasts from the Moon during the Apollo 14 Moon landing, since it uses far less bandwidth than the NTSC system.

Goldmark’s interest in recorded music led to the development of the long-playing (LP) 33-1/3 rpm vinyl record, which became the standard for incorporating multiple or lengthy recorded works on a single audio disc for two generations. The LP was introduced to the market place by Columbia Records in 1948.

In 1959 the CBS Audimax I Audio Gain Controller was introduced. It was the first of its kind in the broadcasting industry, and updated versions (Audimax 4440) continued to be manufactured by Thompson-CSF, which acquired the technology after the Labs were closed. In the 1960s the CBS VoluMax Audio FM Peak Limiter was introduced, also the first of its kind in the broadcasting industry. Both the Audimax and VoluMax were considered the “gold standard” for audio processing used in the AM/FM and Television Broadcasting industry.

At the same time, CBS Laboratories developed a solid-state character generator, a crucial component of the VIDIAC (Visual Information Display and Control) system built for the Air Force by a collaboration of several companies. Known as the "magnetic memory character generator," this component was responsible for storing and retrieving high quality alphanumeric characters, which was essential for the high-speed data display.

Electronic Video Recording was announced in 1967. In 1966, the CBS Vidifont was invented. It was the first electronic graphics generator used in television production. Brought to the marketplace at the NAB in 1970, it revolutionized television production. The minicam was developed for use in national political conventions in 1968. In 1971, a backwards-compatible 4-channel encoding technique was developed for vinyl records, called SQ Quadraphonic, based on work by musician Peter Scheiber and Labs engineer Benjamin B. Bauer.

That same year, CBS Labs Staff Scientist Dennis Gabor received the Nobel Prize in Physics for earlier work on holography. Upon Peter Goldmark's retirement, also in 1971, Senior Vice President Renville H. McMann assumed the role of Labs President.

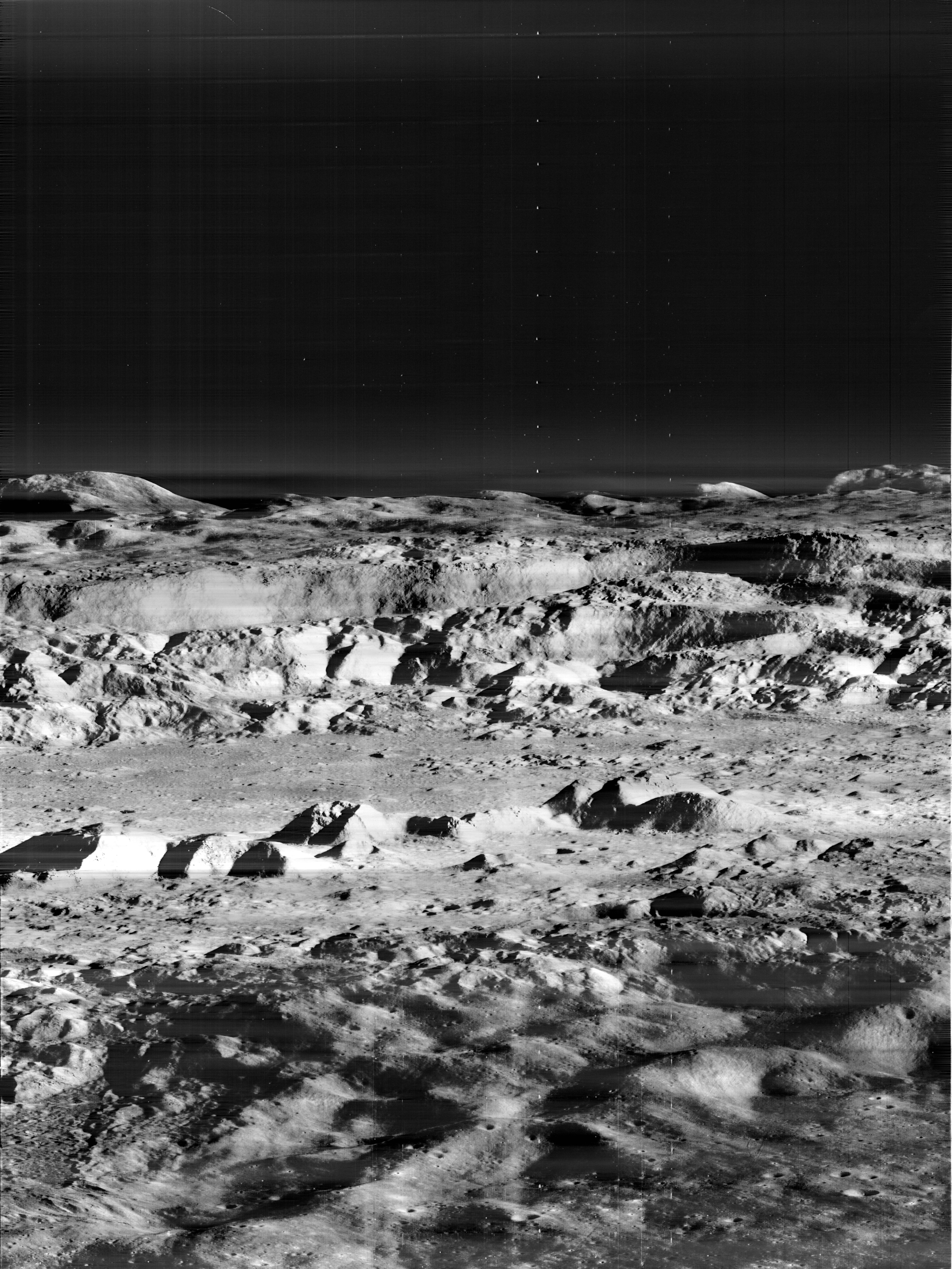
Called the "Photograph of the Century" by space scientists, this first close-up picture of the crater Copernicus taken by the Lunar Orbiter was scanned and digitized by the CBS Laboratories film scanning system and transmitted back to Earth.

At the same time that CBS Laboratories developed technologies for the CBS Television Network, it also took on similar work for the Government. CBS Laboratories was selected by NASA Manned Spacecraft Center to provide the voice recorder for the Gemini space program (1964 - 1966). The Labs designed and built a very small (2.5 in square x .415 in thick) and reliable onboard voice recorder. CBS also generated and aired simulations and animations of some NASA space missions during their coverage.

An aerospace qualified film scanning system, consisting of a CBS Laboratories Line Scan Tube was developed for the Lunar Orbiter program to read out the processed film images taken by the Orbiter for transmission back to Earth.

The CBS Laboratories Reconotron all-electrostatic image dissector tube was developed for the 1964 Mariner IV Mars mission as an azimuth star tracker, then was modified for the 1967 Mariner V Venus mission in order to withstand the intense planetary illumination. The sensor was further modified for the 1969 Mariner mission to Mars to survive the more severe launch environment and to provide greater capability for automatic search, identification, and tracking.

In 1964 the Mergenthaler Co. and CBS Laboratories won a GPO contract to build a machine called the Linotron. The Linotron took a computer magnetic tape from the publishing agency that had been programmed through GPO’s computers, and composed the data in 6-point type at the rate of a page every 10 to 12 seconds, up to 1,000 characters per second, justified including upper and lower case letters, resulting in a page negative made up and ready to be plated and printed. This was accomplished using a highly-specialized Cathode Ray Tube developed by CBS Laboratories which had unequaled geometric fidelity and resolution. The introduction of the Linotron was characterized as “the most important development in composition since the introduction of the Linotype machine at the turn of the century.”

The first Linotron went into operation in October 1967 and the second a year later. The dean of the Senate and Chair of the JCP, Senator Carl Hayden of Arizona, pressed the key starting the Linotron 1010 on its first job, the Federal Supply Catalog. The Linotrons cost $2.3 million to develop and install, but in the first 13 months of operation the savings were estimated at $900,000. With it, “it can truly be said that in 1968 the Government Printing Office entered the electronic printing age.”

A detailed discussion and description of the Linotron system can be found here.

CBS Laboratories was a leader in the development of Electron Beam Recorders, (EBR), which use a finely focused beam of electrons to record information onto film. Because the electron beam has no inertia, it can be electromagnetically scanned over the film at a very high speed. Also, because it is focused using a magnetic field, instead of glass lenses, the electron beam can be focused to a much smaller spot than laser or other optical methods, on the order of a half-millionth of an inch.

One of the applications of the Electron Beam Recorder was in the ERTS-Landsat system, whose mission was to capture images of the Earth's surface in different spectral bands to provide data for Earth resource management and environmental monitoring. ThE ERTS satellites generated an immense amount of data, which was transmitted to dedicated ground stations to be recorded and processed for analysis. The ERTS EBR was a crucial part of the ground-station-based image data recording system, capable of producing a thousand 70mm archival quality film images per day, from which all the other ERTS photographic products were produced.

During the Vietnam War, CBS Laboratories developed and produced the scanning and recording equipment for the Compass Link system, which provided one-way, near-real-time secure transmission of photographic and other battlefield imagery via satellite relays from Vietnam to Hawai'i and Washington, DC. Using available equipment, in many cases at the breadboard stage, it was developed, deployed and operational in the field and on shipboard 73 days after approval to proceed. Philco-Ford provided the satellite communications systems.

In 1969, CBS Laboratories developed an advanced, state-of-the-art, MIL-Spec In-Flight Photo-Processor Scanner (IPPS) for JIFDATS (the Joint Services In-Flight Data Transmission System). Mounted in an external pod on a Mach-2, RF-4C reconnaissance aircraft, the target images from a KS-87 airborne film camera were processed, scanned and transmitted within 12 minutes of acquisition to a ground-based Image Interpretation Facility.

== CBS Laboratories technical publications ==
In addition to designing and building commercial and government products and systems, the technical staff was also contracted to write reports and analyses for government clients. Although most of the reports remain classified, a few have been unclassified and are available in the public domain.

== Sale of CBS Laboratories and subsequent history ==
In 1974, CBS Corp., under then-President Arthur R. Taylor, made the decision to focus on its primary media and broadcasting operations, away from the Government R&D and commercial product development, and divest these non-core assets. As part of this reorganization, the CBS Laboratories Professional Products Department, which manufactured the products developed by the Labs for sale to the broadcast industry, was sold to Thomson-CSF.

The remainder of CBS Laboratories, including all of its Government research and development activities, was acquired in 1975 by EPSCO Corp., based in Buffalo, NY, for the purpose of enhancing its technological capabilities and facilitating the entrance into new Government markets. EPSCO renamed the business as Epsco Labs, and after an unsuccessful attempt to convince the CBS Laboratories personnel to relocate to Buffalo, NY, EPSCO moved the complete operations and staff to a facility in Wilton, CT.

Although EPSCO Corp. immediately began the process of novating the CBS Laboratories government R&D contracts to EPSCO, the process turned out to be much more time-consuming than EPSCO anticipated, due to the legal and regulatory implications involved in obtaining Government and Contracting Agency approvals of the many classified programs underway at CBS Laboratories. This year-long time delay greatly increased EPSCO's ongoing costs of funding the acquisition, to the point where EPSCO made the decision to liquidate the entire Epsco Labs facilities, staff and operations in 1976. As a result, all of the assets of the Laboratories, including all machinery, optical equipment, vacuum equipment, electronics, test facilities and equipment, as well as the office equipment, photo lab, machine shop and printing department were sold at auction over a four-day period in late May, 1976.

Simultaneous with the sale of CBS Laboratories, the operation of the Stamford, CT facilities at High Ridge Road was converted to a corporate research center called CBS Technology Center, which conducted advanced development of in-house solutions for the radio and television divisions, as well as advanced development of consumer products for the CBS musical instruments division, including Steinway pianos, Fender guitar amplifiers, and Gulbransen organs.

In 1986, to avoid a hostile takeover of CBS by Ted Turner and others, Laurence Tisch was invited by the CBS board to invest in the company. Subsequent to his assumption of the role of Chairman, Tisch proceeded to divest the company of many of its non-broadcasting properties, and proceeded to terminate the operation of the Technology Center. The two buildings on High Ridge Road were razed and the property sold.

== Patents ==
CBS Laboratories' staff registered approximately 100 patents in the fields of television, quadraphonic sound, scanning devices, laser scanning and recording, film handling systems, image and character generation, noise monitoring, hydrophones, forming electrophoretic and photoemissive surfaces, diffraction optics, photo-electronic imaging, electron guns, and more.

== Emmy awards for CBS Laboratories ==
- 1956: Development of Video Tape by Ampex and Further Development and Practical Applications by CBS - dual entry
- 1958-1959: Industry-wide improvement of editing of Video Tape as exemplified by ABC - CBS – NBC
- 1965-1966: Stop Action Playback - MVR Corporation and CBS
- 1967: CBS Minicam - The CBS Minicam, a portable, battery-powered camera system, received an Engineering Emmy Award for its impact on news gathering and live broadcasting.
- 1968: Electronic Video Recording (EVR) system - CBS Laboratories developed the EVR system, which allowed for the recording and playback of high-quality video using a cassette tape format.
- 1970-1971: The Columbia Broadcasting System – For the development of the Color Corrector, which can provide color uniformity between television picture segments and scenes shot and recorded under different conditions at different times and locations.
- 1970-1971: CBS Laboratories received the Engineering Emmy Award for their development of the "Miniature Rapid Deployment Earth Terminal" (MRDET), which was recognized for its significant contributions to the field of television technology.
- 1974-1975: Emmy Award for CBS Laboratories' Electronic News Gathering System
- 1977-1978 CBS, INC. For the development of the Digital Noise Reducer
- 1978: CBS Fieldtronics - The CBS Fieldtronics system, a portable, electronic news gathering system, received an Engineering Emmy Award for its contributions to live broadcasting.
- 1978 Engineering Emmy Award for "Improved SMPTE Color Bars Standard ECR 1-1978" awarded to CBS Technology Center and the Society of Motion Picture and Television Engineers.

== Awards and industry recognition for CBS Laboratories staff ==
=== Nobel Prize awarded to CBS Laboratories Staff Scientist ===
The 1971 Nobel Prize in Physics was awarded to Dr. Dennis Gabor, Staff Scientist at CBS Laboratories, who was also affiliated with the Imperial Colleges of Science and Technology, London, United Kingdom, “for his invention and development of the holographic method.” A description of his work, given at his Nobel Prize Lecture, can be found here.

=== David Sarnoff Medal Recipients for CBS Laboratories Technical Staff ===
1969: Peter C. Goldmark

1976: Adrian B. Ettlinger

1977: Renville H. McMann

1989: William E. Glenn
