= Stanley Lebar =

American engineer

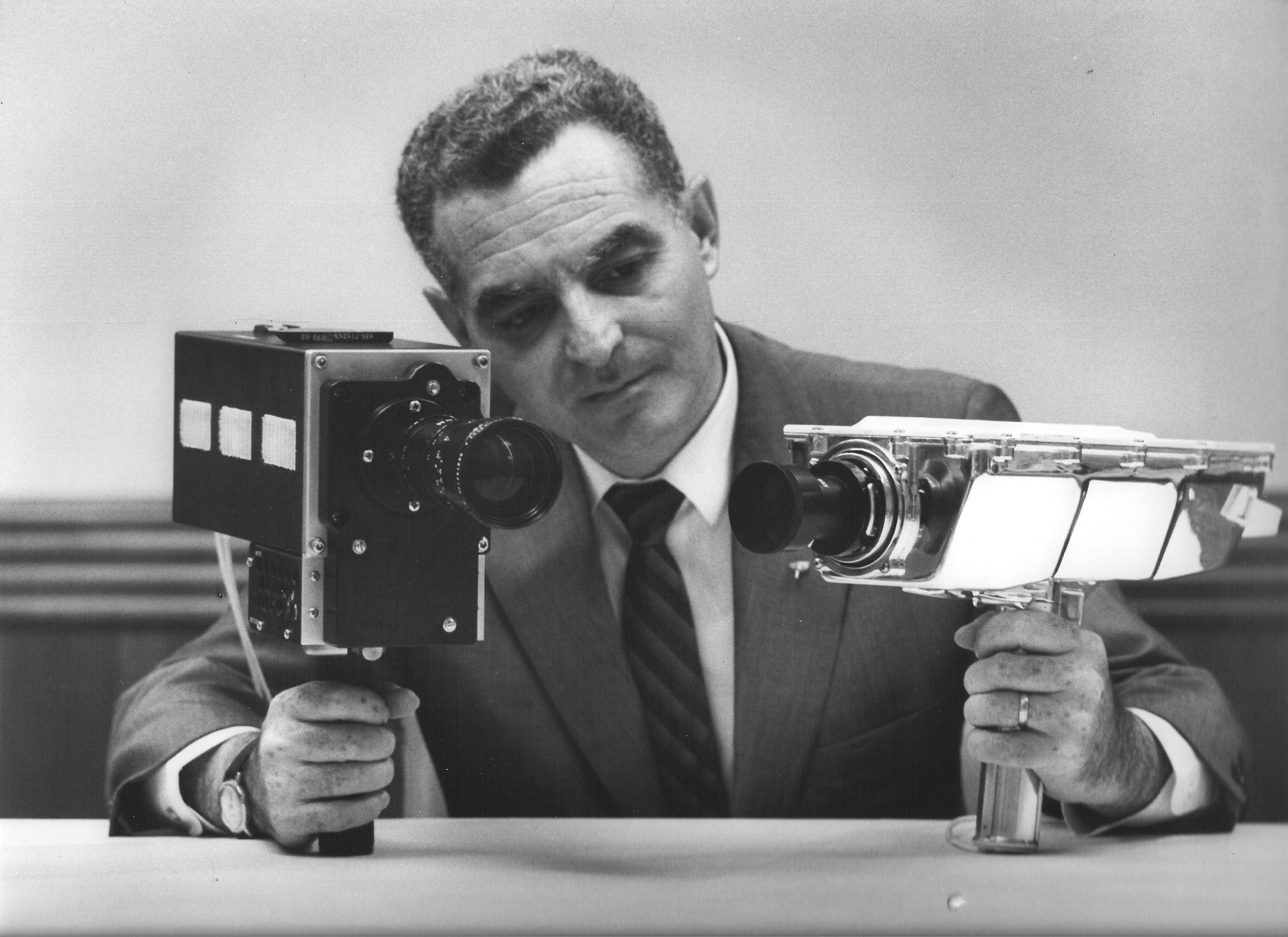
Lebar demonstrating the Apollo 11 cameras

Stanley L. Lebar (July 29, 1925 in Richmond, Virginia – December 23, 2009 in Baltimore, Maryland) was an American engineer who constructed the television cameras used during the Apollo program.

== Biography ==
During World War II, Lebar served as a shooter with the Consolidated B-24 Liberator, then studied electrical engineering at the University of Missouri until 1950. In 1953, he joined Westinghouse Electric Corporation in Baltimore.

In 1964, Westinghouse was commissioned by NASA to develop a TV camera capable of withstanding the extreme temperatures of the Moon and weighing only seven pounds instead of the then 400 pounds. After five years, Lebar was the head of a team of 75 engineers and technicians and more than 300 manufacturers. This black-and-white camera finally transmitted the first steps of Neil Armstrong on the Moon during the television transmission of the Moon landing in 1969. Lebar's innovations to cameras affected technology as a whole.

Later, Lebar also developed a color television camera for the Apollo program, as well as the cameras for the Skylab space station.

For the successful development of this camera and the color television transmissions of the Apollo program, the company Westinghouse received an Emmy in the technology category, which Lebar accepted in 1970.

Lebar died at the age of 84 of complications from surgery.
