= Clipping (photography) =

Limitation in digital photography and video

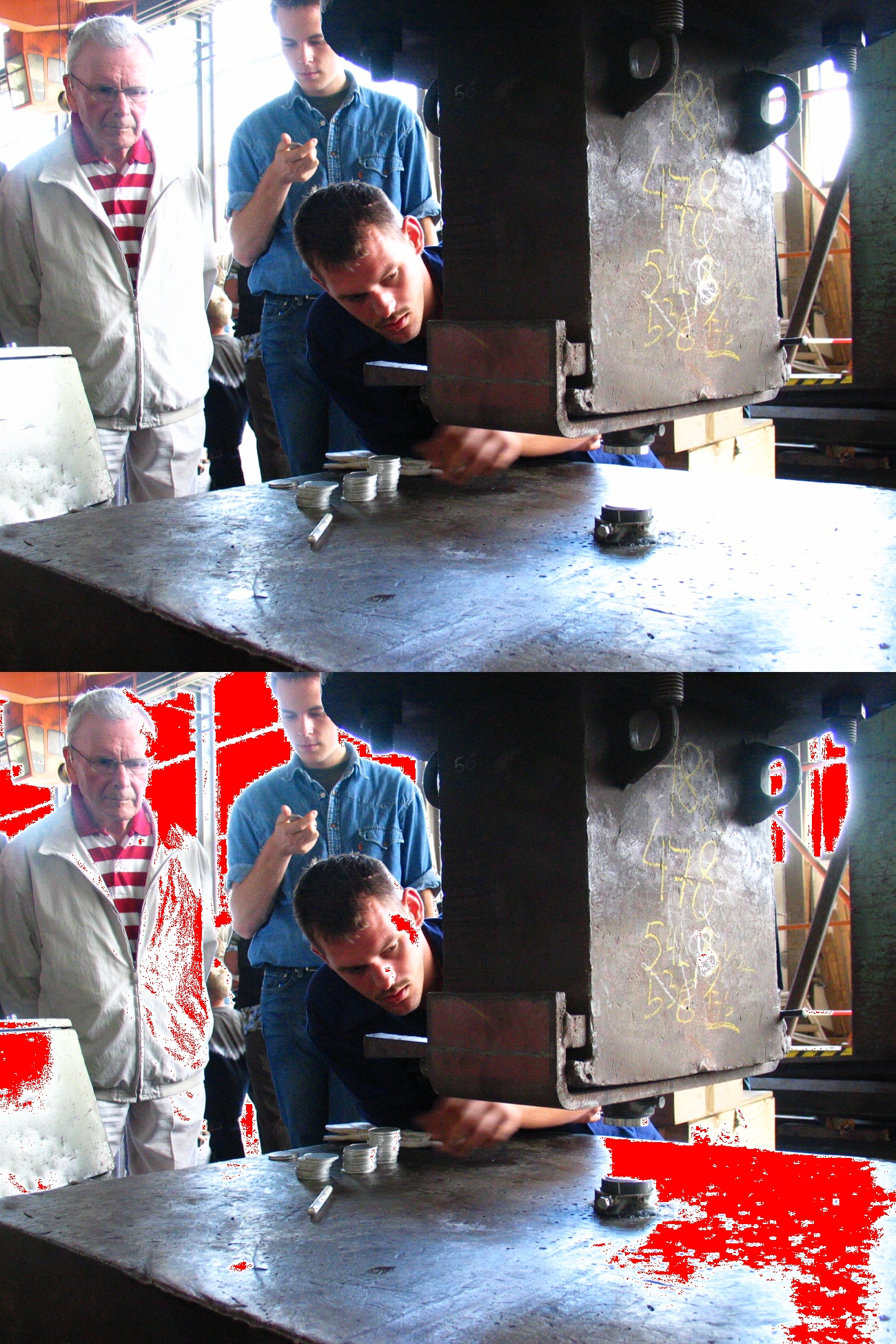
Example image exhibiting blown-out highlights. Top: original image, bottom: blown-out areas marked red

In digital photography and digital video, clipping is a result of capturing or processing an image where the intensity in a certain area falls outside the minimum and maximum intensity which can be represented. It is an instance of signal clipping in the image domain. The clipped area of the image will typically appear as a uniform area of the minimum or maximum brightness, losing any image detail. The amount by which values were clipped, and the extent of the clipped area, affect the degree to which the clipping is visually noticeable or undesirable in the resulting image.

In a color image, clipping may occur in any of the image's color channels separately, which negatively affects colour reproduction.

Clipping can occur at many different stages. It may occur in the image sensor when initially capturing the image using a digital camera or scanner. It may occur due to internal image processing or color space conversion in the camera or scanner. It may also result from later image processing using image editing software. Clipping that is due to internal image processing in a digital camera may often be partially or fully recovered if the raw sensor data is available, such as when saving to a raw image format.

== Clipping due to overexposure ==
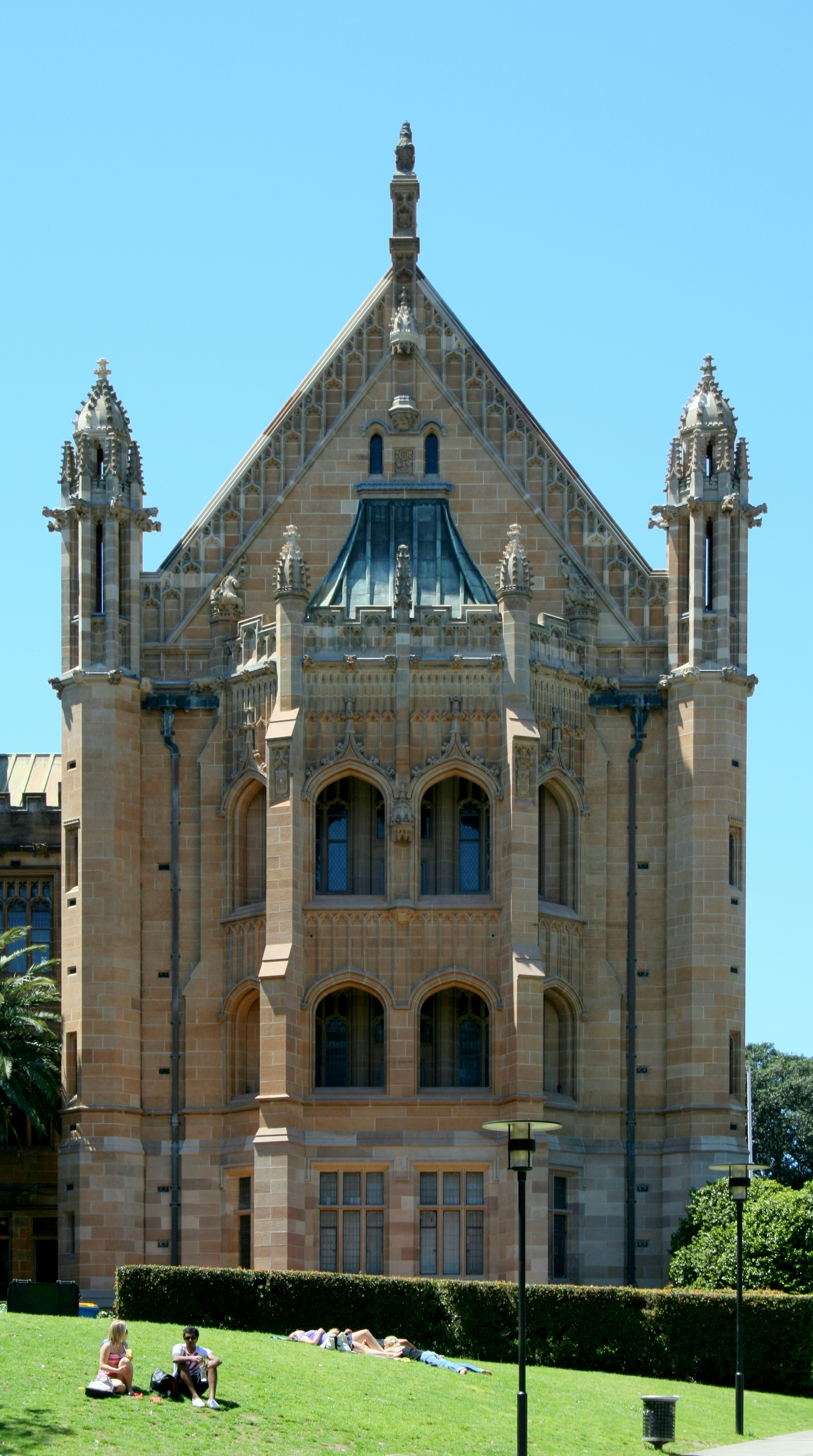
Blue channel clipped in the sky

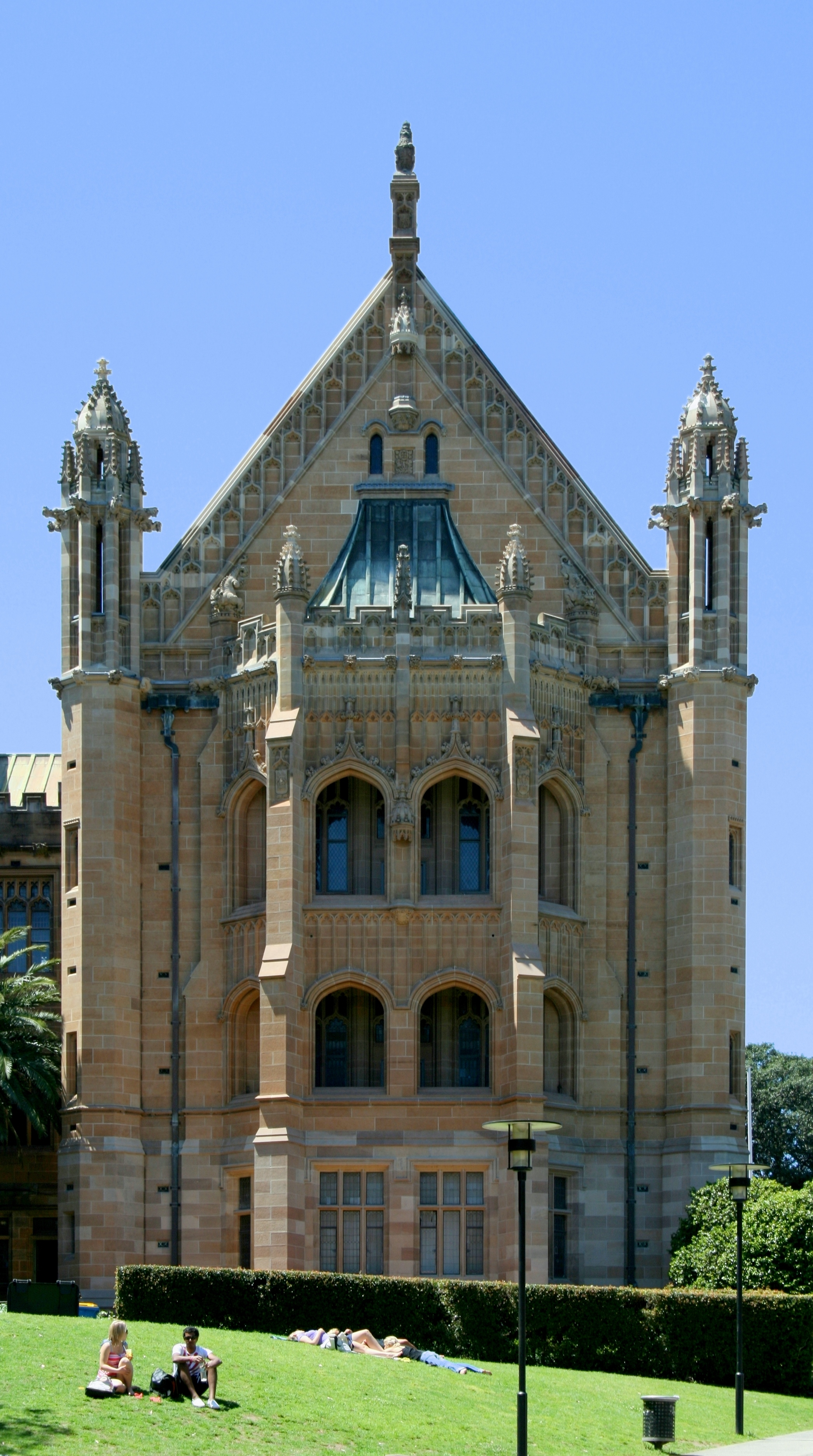
Corrected sky colour

Clipping can often occur in image highlights as a result of an incorrect exposure when initially photographing or scanning to a digital image. Increasing an exposure increases the amount of light collected or the sensitivity of the sensor, and increasing it too far will cause the lightest areas, such as the sky, or light sources, to clip.

Bright areas due to overexposure are sometimes called blown-out highlights. In extreme cases, the clipped area may appear to have a noticeable border between the clipped and non-clipped area. The clipped area will typically be completely white, though in the case that only one color channel has clipped, it may represent itself as an area of distorted color, such as an area of sky that is greener or yellower than it should be.

A similar effect also exists in analog photography, though in that case it is not referred to as clipping, and the blown-out area often curves off gently to its maximum brightness rather than being cut off abruptly as in clipping. This causes blown-out highlights to appear differently in analog and digital photography, with the smooth edges in analog photography regarded as more pleasant to some.

In some cases, a small amount of clipping may be tolerable, especially when the clipped area is in the background of the image rather than part of the main subject, or is only a very small area such as a specular highlight (where a light, or the sun, is reflected in a shiny object).

== Out-of-gamut clipping ==
Clipping in some color channels may occur when an image is rendered to a different color space. When the image contains colors that fall outside the target color space, such colors are referred to as out-of-gamut.

This form of clipping may be avoided by performing the color space conversion using a different rendering intent. However, this can sometimes result in lower overall color saturation, leading to duller colors. The desire for bright, saturated colors may, in some cases, be more important than avoiding clipping in single channels due to out-of-gamut colors.

== Digital video ==
Clipping may occur in digital video, just as in digital still photography. Just as with digital still photography, an intensity value that is outside the allowed range of values in any one channel causes clipping.

== See also ==
- Graduated neutral-density filter
- High-dynamic-range imaging
