= Quadrafile =

Compilation album
- Released: 1976
- Label: Hi-Fi News & Record Review / Link House Publications
- Producer: Mike Thorne

Quadrafile is an LP recording released in 1976 intended as a demonstration of four different systems of quadraphonic sound reproduction on phonograph records.

== Background ==
The record is a double album, with four sides containing identical material presented in each of the four LP based quadraphonic sound formats: SQ, QS, CD-4 and UD-4. These had evolved as the result of four competing companies (CBS, Sansui, JVC and Nippon Columbia respectively) pursuing their own quadraphonic systems independently. This, and the incompatibility of the systems were factors in the slow uptake and eventual downfall of quadraphonic recordings.

The project was put together by Mike Thorne, then editor of Studio Sound magazine. Able to persuade JVC and CBS via his own contacts, he soon found agreement from Sansui and Nippon Columbia and all four companies agreed to encode a side of the album each. Assembling material was more difficult since compilations spanning record labels were not as commonplace as they eventually became.

== Tracks ==
The eventual album includes a set of single and paired reference sounds, a surround-sound demonstration named "Electronic Footsy" (created in collaboration with engineer Tony Faulkner), a Stéphane Grappelli violin duet and two classical pieces by Mahler and Bartok, the latter being conducted by Pierre Boulez, as well as Pink Floyd's "Money" and 2 excerpts from Mike Oldfield's Tubular Bells.

To ensure consistency in the mastering process, Thorne took possession of the actual master tapes of the Pink Floyd album Dark Side of the Moon, which caused him considerable paranoia to the extent that he hid the tapes inside his piano, reasoning that it would be unlikely for a burglar to steal such a hefty object or search inside it.

Quadrafile disc labels

== Reception ==
The album was released just as quadraphonic sound was on the wane. Only 5,000 numbered copies were pressed and are extremely rare collector's items. Some collectors have sought out this release as the only example of Mike Oldfield and Pink Floyd recordings being presented in that particular quad format.

In 1976, Music Educators Journal described Quadrafile in an article on useful materials for music professionals.
