= Matrix H =

Matrix 4-channel quadraphonic sound system

Matrix H was developed by BBC engineers in the late 1970s to carry quadraphonic sound via FM radio in a way that would be most compatible with existing mono and stereo receivers.

== History ==
=== Test broadcasts ===
Several quadraphonic test programs were made for Radios 3 and 4, including a number of plays and some Promenade Concerts, while Radio 1 carried quadraphonic session recordings by various bands.

On April 30, 1977 the first program was transmitted, followed by seven further transmissions during the following week. The experimental broadcasts lasted for one year, after which the BBC assessed the public reaction. Since very few listeners had suitable decoders, the BBC arranged demonstrations at the Langham Gallery in London.

The existing matrix formats where tested first. The "H" has no meaning; they called the first matrix assessed Matrix A, and then worked through the alphabet. Matrix H emerged as the best solution for mono compatibility and radio transmission. Although the QS system was similar to Matrix H, no specific available commercially.

=== BBC/NRDC System HJ ===
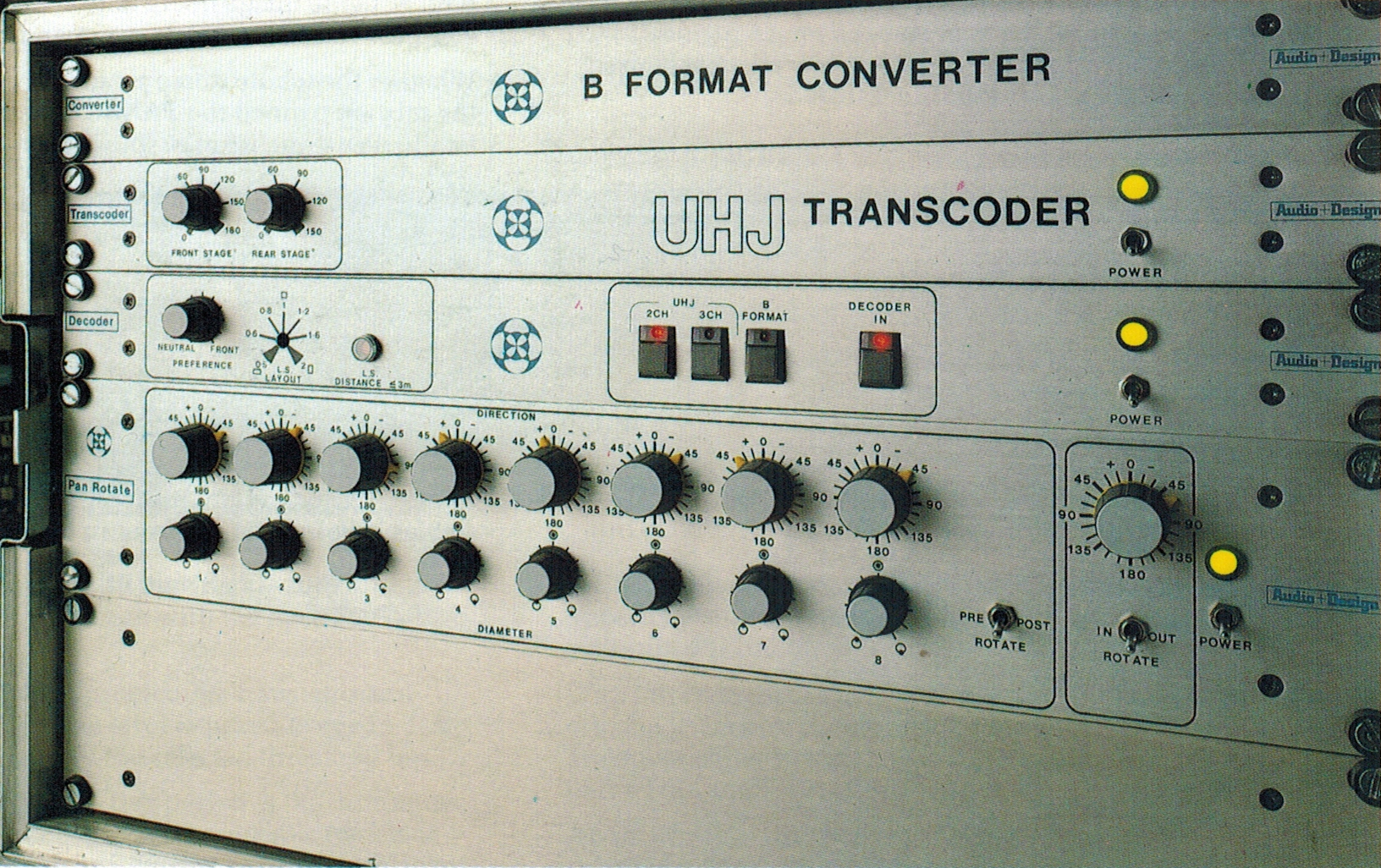
Ambisonic UHJ mixing equipment

The BBC later cooperated with the developers of Ambisonics to produce BBC/NRDC System HJ. This was based on tolerance zones designed to include modified versions of both Matrix H and the prototype two-channel encoding of Ambisonics, known as System 45J. Subsequently, the Nippon-Columbia UMX matrix was brought into the standard, leading in 1977 to the UHJ, now associated with Ambisonics.

== Usage ==
Matrix H decoding Matrix
	Left Front	Right Front	Left Back	Right Back
Left Total	-j0.94	-l0.34	+k0.94	+m0.34
Right Total	+l0.34	+j0.94	-m0.34	-k0.94

j = 20° phase-shift k = 25° phase-shift l = 55° phase-shift m = 115° phase-shift
