= Quadraphonic sound =

Four-channel speaker audio

A four-channel quadraphonic diagram showing the usual placement of speakers around the listener

Quadraphonic (or quadrophonic, also called quadrasonic or by the neologism quadio) sound uses four audio channels in which speakers are positioned at the four corners of a listening space. The system allows for the reproduction of audio signals that are wholly or partly independent of one another. It is an early form of what is now called surround sound.

Four-channel quadraphonic surround sound can be used to recreate the highly realistic effect of a three-dimensional live concert hall experience in the home. It can also be used to enhance the listener experience beyond the directional limitations of ordinary two-channel stereo sound. Quadraphonic audio was the earliest consumer product in surround sound. Since it was introduced to the public in the early 1970s, many thousands of quadraphonic recordings have been made.

Quadraphonic sound was a commercial failure when first introduced because of a variety of technical issues and format incompatibilities. Four-channel audio formats can be more expensive to produce than standard two-channel stereo. Playback requires additional speakers and amplifier channels. It may also require specially designed decoding equipment.

The introduction of home cinema products in the 1990s was first intended for movie sound, but also revived interest in multi-channel music reproduction. By this time, new digitally based formats had been created. Many four-channel recordings from the 1970s have been reissued in modern surround-sound systems such as Super Audio CD, DTS, Dolby Digital, DVD-Audio and Blu-ray. Multichannel home audio reproduction has experienced a revival since 2000, and new four-channel recordings have also been released to the public since this time.

A quadraphonic system will reproduce right front, right rear, left front, and left rear audio signals in four separate speakers. The rear speakers' reproduction capability should be of the same or almost the same quality as the front speakers'; ideally, a quadraphonic system uses four identical speakers.

== History ==
The first machines used for 4-channel sound recording were analog reel-to-reel tape recorders. These were developed for use by audio engineers in professional studios during the 1950s in Germany by Telefunken and also by Ampex in the United States. Such machines appeared in some European electronic-music studios by 1954.

Early attempts to reproduce four-channel sound for home playback began with audio laboratory engineers in the late 1960s. Producer Thomas Mowrey, initially working at the Eastman School of Music, was one of the pioneers of classical quadraphonic recording. He later made quadraphonic productions for Deutsche Grammophon and other labels in the early 1970s, but many of these were released only as stereo recordings.

A small number of quadraphonic recordings were introduced to the American consumer market by Vanguard Records in June 1969 on reel-to-reel tape. The most popular medium used to market recordings to the public during the 1970s was the vinyl LP phonograph record. Quadraphonic recordings on 8-track tape were also popular in the 1970s, particularly among car audio enthusiasts.

In the 1970s, specialized hardware systems were marketed by major electronic manufacturers to the public for decoding 4-channel recordings. These decoders were often sold as separate electronic components. Decoders were also available as built-in features of some audio receivers or amplifiers sold during the 1970s.

Many quadraphonic recordings in the 1970s used Matrix technologies to encode and decode four channels of audio information in a 2-channel medium, usually an LP. The poor decoding performance of early matrix formats was the main reason they disappeared once improved matrix systems arrived. The later matrix systems were based on work by Peter Scheiber. His basic formula used 90° phase-shift circuitry to enable enhanced 4–2–4 matrix systems to be developed, of which the two main leaders were Columbia's SQ and Sansui's QS systems.

The three most popular quadraphonic LP formats in the 1970s were SQ (Stereo Quadraphonic), QS (Regular Matrix) and CD-4 (Compatible Discrete 4) / Quadradisc.

The Japanese governing body and audio hardware manufacturers defined standards for quadraphonic sound. RM (Regular Matrix) was used a synonym for QS, QM (Quadraphonic Matrix was used for Stereo-4 and Dynaquad) and QX (QuadXtra, based on D.H. Cooper "Dual-Triphonic") for UD4.

With Scheiber, Martin Willcocks, and Jim Fosgate developed the Tate II 101 SQ decoder, which produced a very accurate sound field by using gain riding and the Haas effect to mask decoding artifacts. It used custom, hand-assembled and ‑calibrated circuitry with components sorted to 1%, for exact performance. Sansui's QSD-series decoders and QRX-series receivers were very good, even synthesizing left-right stereo into a ⋂ horseshoe topology. However, all these came too late in the game and were too expensive or difficult to procure for public purchase, to rescue matrix quad from obscurity.

By the early 2000s, more sophisticated "discrete" multichannel systems had mostly replaced matrix technologies, providing a higher level of performance and full channel independence. Today, software can be used to take the place of hardware decoding. Modern software algorithms are capable of more accurate decoding performance than the earlier hardware technologies.

All of the multichannel audio systems in common use today are digital systems. Digital multichannel audio has been available for the home since the introduction of surround sound movies in the 1990s, using Dolby Digital and DTS. The most common digital media capable of reproducing surround sound music today are Super Audio CD, DVD, and Blu-ray, all of which are capable of playing high-resolution audio with multiple channels.

== Quadraphonic audio mixing ==
The audio mixing process for four-channel sound is different than for stereo versions of the same recording. Most studio equipment is designed for stereo only, so specialized multichannel mixing consoles and playback systems must be available.

For classical music, producers have typically preferred an effect where the orchestra appears in stereo in only the front channels, and the natural reverberation or echo of the concert hall is in all the speakers. Some live concert recordings of popular music have also been mixed this way. Classical recordings rarely place primary or solo instruments in the rear channels, though it is done occasionally.

A few classical recordings have been made from a perspective in which the listener seems to be seated in the middle of the orchestra. One example is the 1973 Columbia Masterworks recording of Béla Bartók's Concerto for Orchestra, conducted by Pierre Boulez. The original four-channel recording was released on matrix LP and 8-track tape, and reissued on the Super Audio CD format by Dutton Vocalion in 2018. Notes supplied with the recording indicate the direction from which each group of instruments can be heard.

Pop, rock and jazz music producers have tended to employ a mixing style with a relatively high degree of musical separation between the four channels. This type of recording may place musical sounds in the rear channels that are of equal importance to the front channels. It can expand on the listener's sense of direction and spaciousness in a way similar to what happened when recording engineers introduced stereo recording. In some four-channel recordings, sounds move in full rotation around the listener.

Mixing engineers can also aim for a hybrid effect between styles. While quadraphonic effects have sometimes been considered artificial, musical enjoyment can be dramatically enhanced by more fully involving the listener.

== LP phonograph records ==
Quadraphonic audio reproduction on vinyl phonograph records was problematic. As technologies advanced rapidly during the 1970s, several different solutions were proposed to reproduce four-channel sound from LPs. Some of these systems were much more successful than others. The simplest systems were derived (2–2–4) formats. These were soon followed by much more sophisticated matrix (4–2–4) formats, and finally, by the most advanced discrete (4–4–4) formats.

=== Derived (2–2–4) formats ===
Derived (2–2–4) formats are simple and often passive arrangements that rely on extracting the stereo difference or other out‑of‑phase information from stereo records to synthesize a surround‑sound effect. The material emphasized in the rear channels often includes studio reverb, concert‑hall ambience, and audience applause. Because a derived system operates on unintentional phase differences in the original stereo mix, precise placement of individual instruments in the rear speakers is not possible. However, centrally panned (i.e. monophonic) information remains center-front.

- DY / Dynaquad (1969)
- Hafler circuit (1969)

=== Matrix (4–2–4) formats ===
With matrix formats, four channels are converted (encoded) down to two channels. These are then passed through a two-channel transmission medium (usually an LP record) before being decoded to four channels and presented to four speakers. To transmit four individual audio signals in a stereo-compatible manner, there must be four simultaneous linear equations to reproduce the original four audio signals at the output.

These systems used matrix decoding technology to recover four channels from the two channels recorded on the record. Matrix systems can have a significant level of channel independence but not full channel separation.

- EV / Stereo-4 (1970)
- DY / Dynaquad (used as an encoding format on some records) (1971)
- SQ / Stereo Quadraphonic (1971)
- QS (Quadraphonic Sound)/ RM (Regular Matrix) (1971)

Matrix quadraphonic recordings can be played in two channels on conventional stereo record players. There are varying levels of stereo and mono compatibility in these systems. The term compatible indicates that:

1. A single-channel (mono) system will reproduce all four audio signals in its one speaker.
2. two-channel (stereo) system will reproduce the left front and left rear audio signals in the left speaker and the right front and right rear signals in the right speaker.

This 4:2:4 process could not be accomplished without some information loss. That is to say, the four channels produced at the final stage were not truly identical to those with which the process had begun. In order for the effect to work as intended a recording engineer needed to be specially trained for working in each of these formats. Special mixing rules for matrix recording minimize the technological limitations inherent in matrix formats and mask or eliminate undesired side effects.

==== EV-4/Stereo-4 and Dynaquad (DY) ====
The first of these were basic systems with relatively poor performance developed by Electro-Voice (EV-4/Stereo-4) and Dynaco (Dynaquad (DY)). A so-called matrix format, it utilized four sound channels which were encoded into a stereo album track. These were then decoded into the original four sound channels. But with poor decode performance, these systems failed to match the accuracy or channel independence of later matrix formats.

The original systems (DY and EV-4) suffered from low front left-right separation (around 12 dB) and a poor rear left-right separation of 2 dB. The decoders were designed more to give an effect rather than accurate decoding, which was mainly due to limitations in both systems. Since both systems were very closely related mathematically, users only needed one decoder of either system to playback albums of both systems.

The differences between the early and late matrix systems were so vast that it made decoding DY/EV-4 with either SQ or QS decoders with accuracy impossible; the results often being a smeared or poorly defined sound stage, which could be vastly different from what was intended by the producer or recording engineer.

==== QS Regular Matrix and SQ Quadraphonic ====
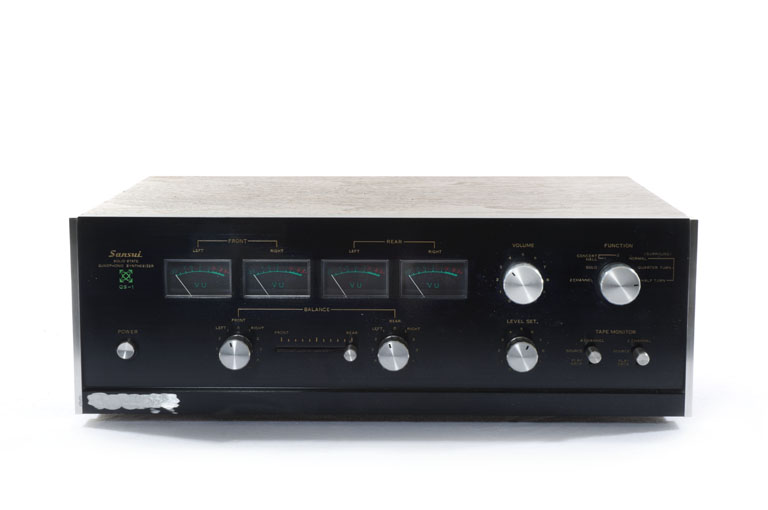
Sansui QS sound decoder

Improved systems based on Peter Scheiber's work on utilizing 90-degree phase-shift circuitry came later, namely the QS and SQ systems.

The first of these, known as QS, was developed by Sansui Electric. A so-called matrix format, it utilized four sound channels, which were encoded into stereo. These were then decoded into the original four sound channels. The QS system debuted in the United States in March 1971 and was improved by their Vario-Matrix system in 1973.

The second, SQ, was developed and marketed by Columbia Records and Sony and entered the US market in April 1971. The SQ format was also used by companies such as EMI in Great Britain, who pressed several SQ album releases. The sound separation of the SQ system was greatly improved by the introduction of SQ Full Logic decoding in 1975 using the Motorola chips MC1312, MC1314 & MC1315.

Both SQ and QS had significant support from major record companies and hardware manufacturers during the 1970s. They also achieved notable sales and market penetration. Unfortunately, due to the similarities in name and technology, these could easily be confused by the public.

=== Discrete (4–4–4) formats ===
Discrete reproduction describes a quadraphonic system in which all four channels are fully independent of each other. As its name suggests, with discrete formats the original four audio channels are passed through a four-channel transmission medium and presented to a four-channel reproduction system and fed to four speakers. This is defined as a 4–4–4 system.

- CD-4 (Compatible Discrete 4) / Quadradisc (1972)
- UD-4 / UMX / BMX (1974)

Discrete phonograph systems use a specialized demodulator to decode four fully independent sound channels. This allowed for full channel separation. Such systems could be prone to reduced record life. However, more durable vinyl formulations were quickly developed to work around this problem, and nearly all discrete LPs use special vinyl. When discrete quadraphonic LPs are played on conventional stereo record players, the entire music program can be heard in stereo.

==== CD-4 or Quadradisc ====
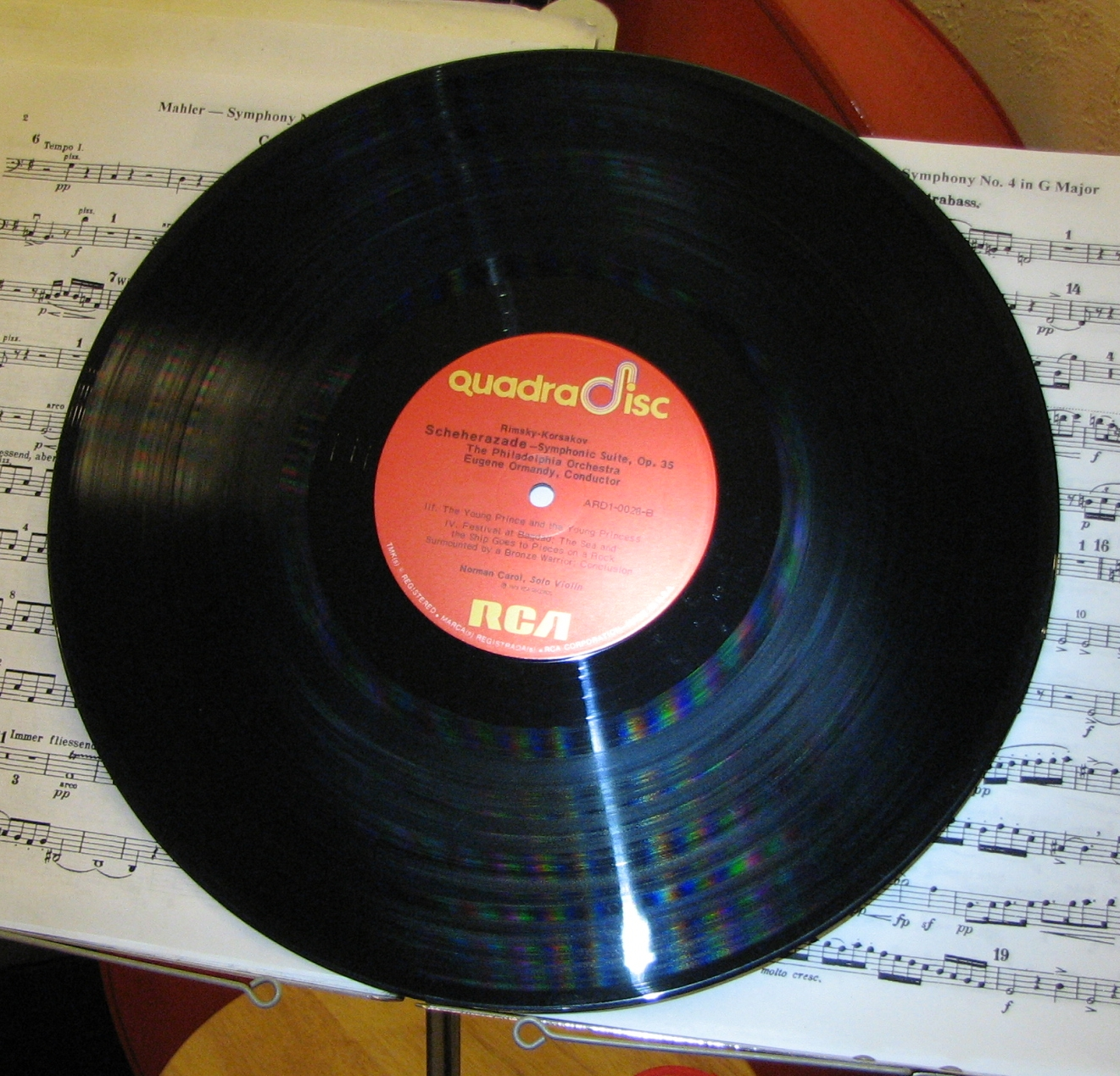
An RCA Quadradisc record

The third major format for four-channel vinyl LPs, known as CD-4 or Quadradisc, was devised by the Japanese JVC Corporation along with its US counterpart RCA Records.

This quadraphonic format was first marketed in the United States in May 1972. A fully discrete system, it eschewed matrix technologies in favor of a method similar to the encoding of stereo FM broadcasts. With stereo records, the system uses 2 main left and right audio channels, and this is what allows CD-4 to maintain compatibility with conventional stereo playback. CD-4 also adds 2 additional difference audio channels to the main channels. The difference signals are encoded in ultrasonic carrier frequencies in the range of 30 kHz, which is above the audible range. CD-4 requires a specialized phono cartridge with a Shibata stylus to read these additional high frequencies. The combined signals are then sent to a special demodulator for four-channel decoding. The demodulator converts the ultrasonic signals back into the audible range and uses the difference channels to separate rear audio information from the main channels. Because the CD-4 system maintains four independent signals throughout the process, it can accurately reconstruct the intended four-channel sound field.

==== UD-4 / UMX / BMX ====
UD-4/UMX was developed by Nippon/Columbia (Denon). This is a hybrid discrete/matrix system. Only 35 to 40 items are encoded in this format, and it was marketed only in the UK, Europe, and Japan.

The short-lived system suffered from incompatibility with regular stereo playback due to phase differences between the left and right channels. UD-4 was less critical in its setup than CD-4 because the ultrasonic carrier signal frequencies were not as high as those found in the CD-4 system.

== Tape formats ==
- Q4 / quadraphonic reel to reel (1969)
- Quad-8 (Q8) / quadraphonic 8-track (1970)

Quadraphonic systems based on tape were also introduced, based on new equipment capable of playing four discrete channels. These recordings are all discrete 4–4–4 recordings released in reel-to-reel and 8-track cartridge formats. Specially designed four-channel machines were required to play these recordings. They are not compatible with stereo players.

=== Quadraphonic open reel tape (Q4) ===
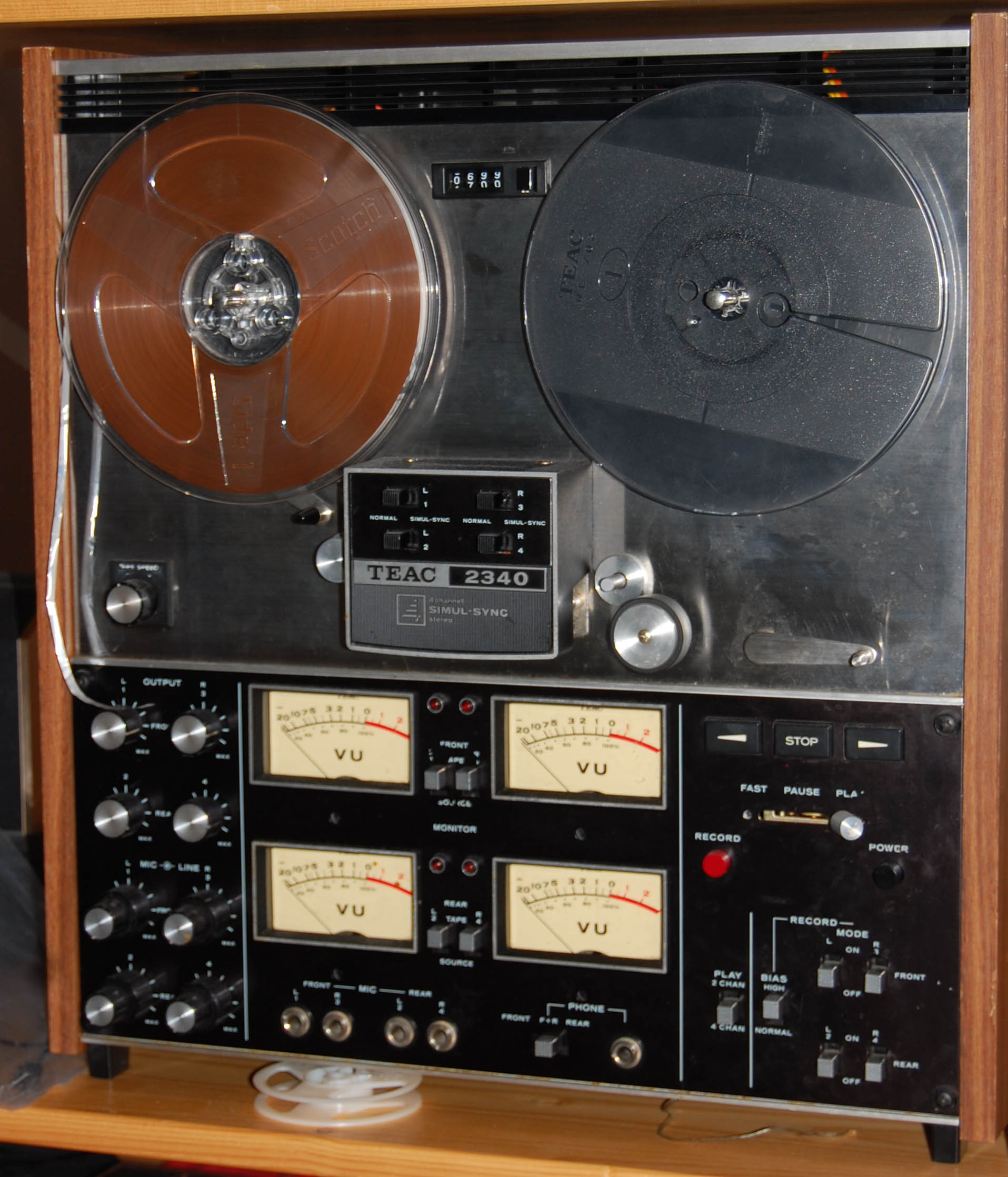
A four-channel reel-to-reel tape unit from the 1970s, one of the few ways to achieve discrete four-channel sound at home

In these systems, all four available tracks were recorded on the tape running in the same direction. Pre-recorded four-channel reel-to-reel tapes were recorded at 7 1/2 inches per second (IPS), which is the fastest speed used for consumer-grade reel-to-reel machines. By comparison, stereo pre-recorded reel-to-reel tapes have 2 different programs, with each running in the opposite direction. Many stereo tapes were recorded at only 3 3/4 IPS, half of the full speed. The slower speed results in reduced sound quality.

=== Quadraphonic 8-track tape (Quad-8 and Q8) ===
RCA Records followed, in April 1970, with its announcement of a four-channel version of the 8-track tape, named Quad-8 or Quadraphonic 8-track tape (later shortened to just Q8). These eventually appeared in staggered releases (70 Tapes) split by October, November, and December 1970.

The format was almost identical in appearance to stereo 8-tracks, except for a small sensing notch in the upper left corner of the cartridge. This signaled a quadraphonic 8-track player to combine the odd tracks as audio channels for program 1, and the even tracks as channels for program 2. The format was not backward-compatible with stereo or mono players; although quadraphonic players would play stereo 8-tracks, playing quadraphonic tapes on stereo players resulted in hearing only one-half the channels at a time.

The last release in the quadraphonic 8-track format was in 1978, although most had stopped appearing by the end of 1976.

== Radio broadcast formats ==
There were some experiments done with radio broadcasts (e.g., a Cliff Richard concert by the BBC, whose earliest quadraphonic broadcast was in July 1974), but they were short-lived.

One of the longest-lived radio broadcasts was WQSR-FM "Quad 102½" in Sarasota, Florida. Throughout most of the 1970s, this station broadcast a signal which could be tuned as two separate stations with conventional stereo receivers.

San Francisco classical music station KKHI-FM broadcast the San Francisco Opera in "compatible" (that is, matrix-encoded) quadraphonic format during the 1970s, as did Chicago station WFMT's live "Chicago Lyric Opera" broadcasts.

KRMH-FM ("Good Karma Radio")(San Marcos/Austin, Texas) broadcast in "Quad Stereo" in the early 1970s from its studios and transmitter near Buda, Texas.

WWWW-FM (W4-QUAD 106.7) (Detroit) broadcast QS encoded quadraphonic sound in 1974.

KEXL-FM ("KEXL 104.5") (San Antonio, Texas) broadcast in "Quadraphonic" in the early to mid 1970s from its studios in a high-rise office building off Main Plaza.

Seattle station KIRO-FM 100.7 later branded as KSEA 101 broadcast several hours daily between 1973 and early 1976 encoded SQ quadraphonic music. Sunday morning's "Music and the Spoken Word" from Salt Lake's Mormon Tabernacle was in SQ quad.

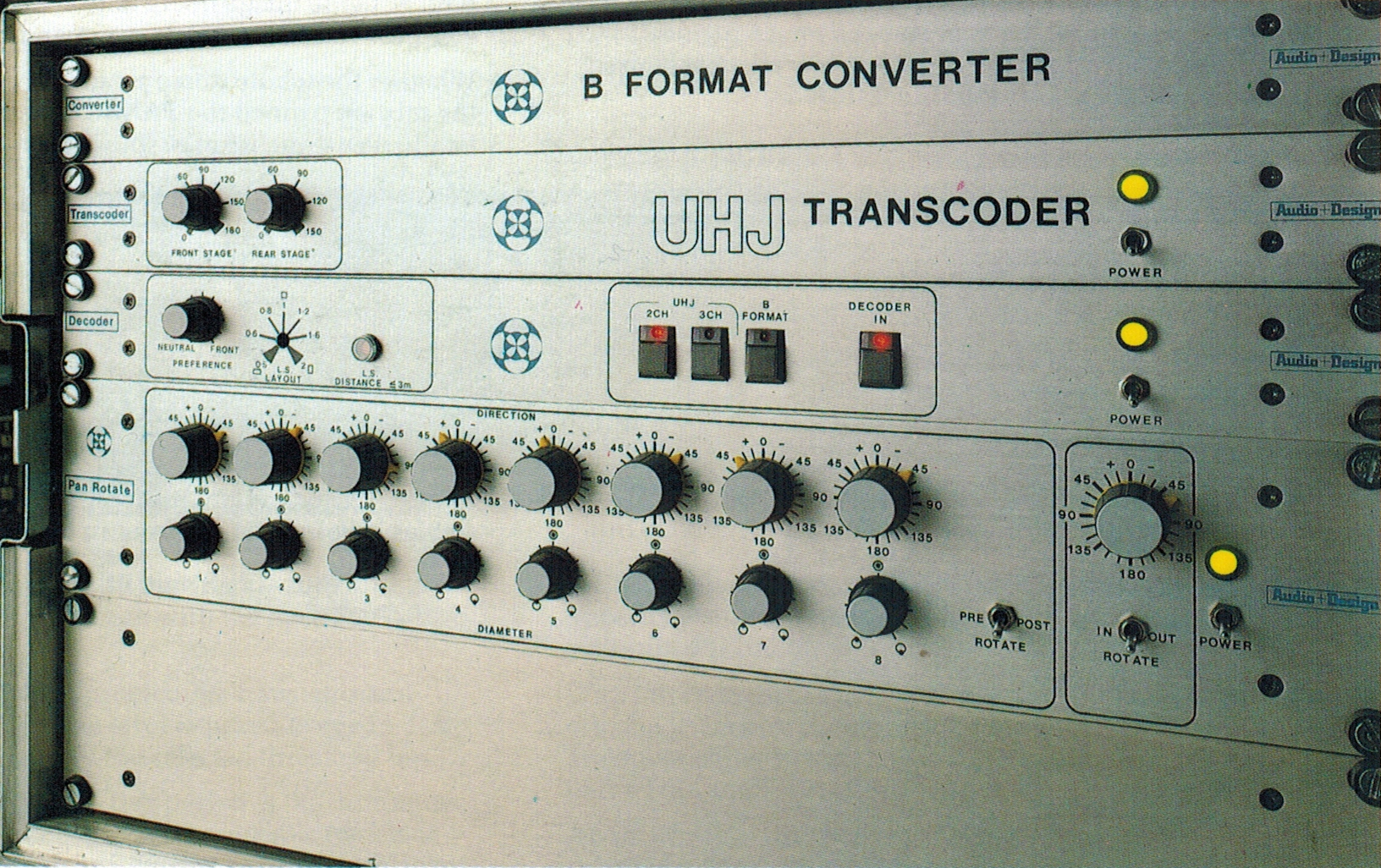
Ambisonic mixing equipment

Matrix H was developed by BBC engineers in 1977 to carry quadraphonic sound via FM radio in a way which would be most compatible with existing mono and stereo receivers.

Quadraphonic test programmes were made for BBC Radio 3 and BBC Radio 4, including plays and The Proms.

The existing matrix formats were tested first. The "H" does not stand for a word; they called the first matrix they assessed Matrix A, and then worked through the alphabet. Matrix H emerged as the best solution for mono compatibility and radio transmission, but there was no specific commercially available decoder for it.

The BBC later cooperated with the developers of Ambisonics to produce BBC/NRDC System HJ. This was based on tolerance zones designed to include modified versions of both Matrix H and the prototype two-channel encoding of Ambisonics, known as System 45J. Subsequently, the Nippon-Columbia UMX matrix was brought into the standard, leading to the final UHJ name now associated with Ambisonics.

=== Universal SQ ===
In 1976, Ben Bauer integrated matrix and discrete systems into USQ, or Universal SQ (others had also done this with their quad systems).

It was a hierarchical 4–4–4 discrete matrix which used the SQ matrix as the baseband for discrete quadraphonic FM broadcasts using additional difference signals called T and Q. For a USQ FM broadcast, the additional T modulation was placed at 38 kHz in quadrature to the standard stereo difference signal, and the Q modulation was placed on a carrier at 76 kHz.

For standard two-channel SQ Matrix broadcasts, CBS recommended that an optional pilot-tone be placed at 19 kHz in quadrature to the regular pilot-tone to indicate SQ encoded signals and activate the listener's logic decoder. CBS argued that the SQ system should be selected as the standard for quadraphonic FM because, in FCC listening tests of the various four-channel broadcast proposals, the 4:2:4 SQ system, decoded with a CBS Paramatrix decoder, outperformed 4:3:4 (without logic) as well as all other 4:2:4 (with logic) systems tested, approaching the performance of a discrete master tape within a very slight margin. At the same time, the SQ "fold" to stereo and mono was preferred to the stereo and mono "fold" of 4:4:4, 4:3:4 and all other 4:2:4 encoding systems.

== Live concerts ==
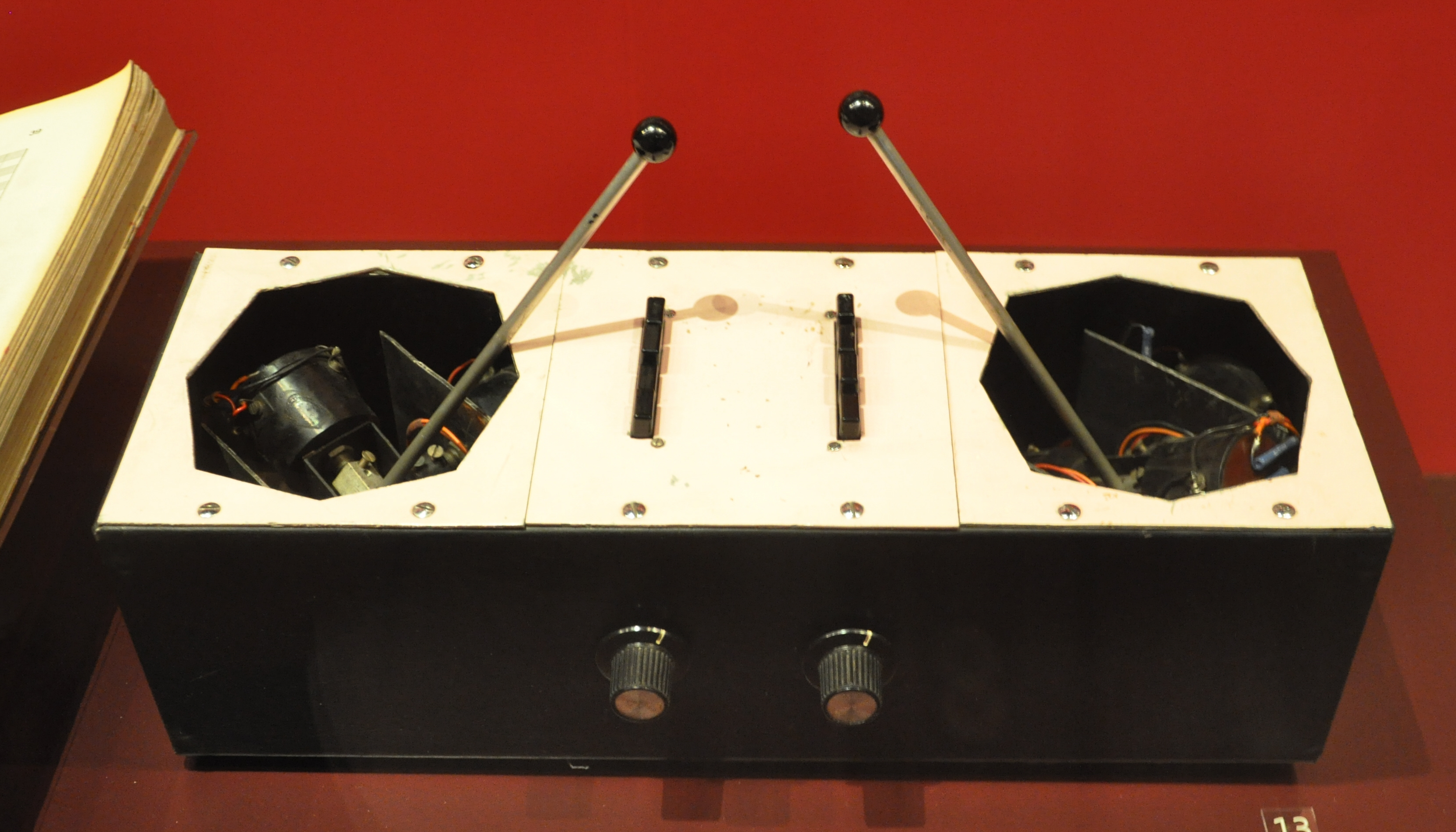
Azimuth Co-ordinator used by Pink Floyd, made by Bernard Speight, 1969 (Victoria & Albert Museum, London)

In 1967, the group Pink Floyd debuted its custom-made quadraphonic speaker system and performed the first-ever surround-sound rock concert. This event was named "Games for May" and was held at London's Queen Elizabeth Hall. A control device they had made, the Azimuth Co-ordinator, used dual joysticks. It is now displayed at London's Victoria and Albert Museum, as part of their Theatre Collections gallery. The controller, which was usually operated by Richard Wright, allowed the musicians to place sounds in any speaker and move them around the listening area.

== Format comparisons ==
In 1976, Mike Thorne created the vinyl album Quadrafile, with the same music recorded on all four of its sides, each side in a different quadraphonic format (QS, SQ, CD-4, and UD-4).

== See also ==
- Category:Quadraphonic albums
- Ambiophonics
- Azimuth Co-ordinator
- Four-channel Compact Disc Digital Audio
- Matrix decoder
- Multitrack recording
- Octophonic sound
