= Compatible Discrete 4 =

Discrete 4-channel quadraphonic gramophone record format developed by JVC

- CD-4 logo
- Media type: Phonograph record
- Encoding: Analog signal
- Capacity: Four audio channels
- Read mechanism: phono cartridge
- Developed by: JVC, RCA
- Usage: Audio storage
- Released: 1972

Compatible Discrete 4, also known as Quadradisc or CD-4 (not to be confused with compact disc) was a discrete four-channel quadraphonic system for phonograph records. The system was created by JVC and RCA in 1971 and introduced in May 1972. Hundreds of recordings using this technology were released on LP during the 1970s.

Other major record companies who adopted this format include A&M, Arista, Atlantic, Capricorn, Elektra, Fantasy, Nonesuch, Reprise and Warner Bros.

This was the only discrete quadraphonic phonograph record system to gain major industry acceptance. A competing system, UD-4, was later introduced by Denon (Nippon Columbia).

In discrete quadraphonic systems, all four channels remain fully independent of each other throughout the entire recording and reproduction chain. There is no intermingling of channels as is done in matrix decoder 4-channel systems such as Stereo Quadraphonic (SQ) and QS Regular Matrix.

Though CD-4 and other quadraphonic technologies were not widely accepted by the public, CD-4 was responsible for major improvements in stereo phonograph technology. These improvements included phono cartridges with higher compliance, lower distortion levels, wider frequency range, and new vinyl compounds for records. Such new compounds included JVC's "Supervinyl", which was more durable than conventional materials, and Q-540, which was highly anti-static. Additionally, several manufacturers still make Shibata styli, such as Audio Technica and Excel, who offers the Hana S moving coil cartridge.

== Equipment ==
Successful CD-4 playback in 4 channels requires a phono cartridge that can reproduce high frequency range carrier signals that extend well beyond normal human hearing. CD-4 cartridges are more critical in set-up requirements than those used for stereo records and for UD-4. This is because stereo records do not have carrier signals and the frequency of the carrier signals used in CD-4 are higher than those found in the UD-4 system.

Phono cartridges with very high-frequency range were rare in the 1970s but became much more common in later years. Only through the use of an elliptical tip stylus is the cartridge able to accurately reproduce the necessary extended range. This stylus is usually marketed as a Shibata or line contact type. By contrast, a standard conical or cone shape stylus has less contact area with the record groove.

CD-4 playback in 4 channels also usually requires a specialized CD-4 demodulator. Such demodulators have not been sold commercially since the 1970s, but today software decoding is also possible. Hardware decoders were often sold as independent components. However, some audio receivers and/or amplifiers built in the 1970s included the CD-4 demodulator as a built-in feature, along with FM radio and amplifier circuitry.

A typical high-performance CD-4 system would include a turntable with a CD-4 compatible phono cartridge, a CD-4 demodulator, a four-channel amplifier (or receiver), and four identical full-range loudspeakers.

CD-4 encoded records were also compatible with conventional two-channel stereo playback systems. In stereo mode all four channels of music can be heard over two speakers. Specialized equipment is not required for stereo playback.

== Operation ==
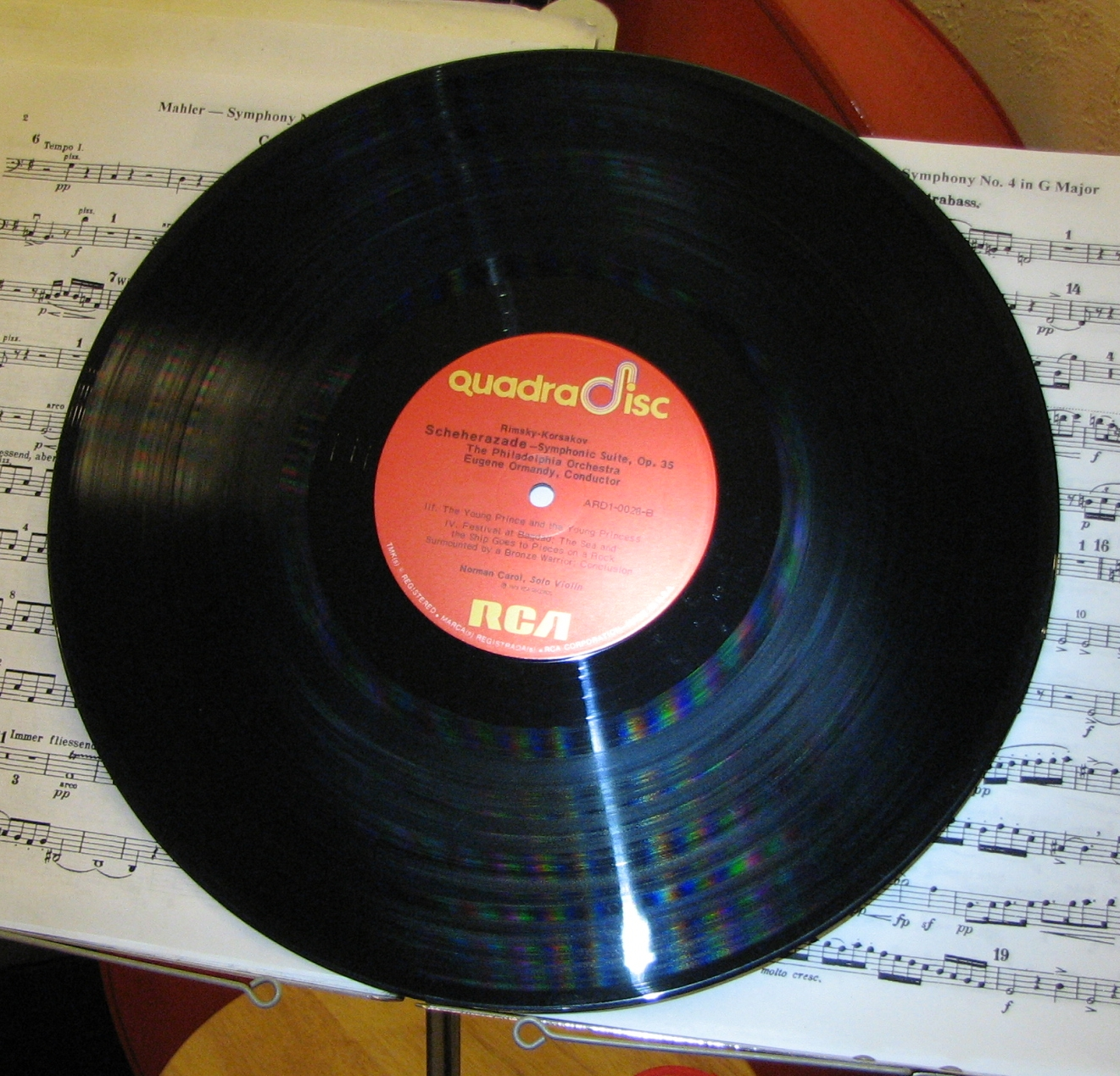
An RCA Quadradisc recording. The color fringes around the reflections are caused by the ultrasonic signal that contains the difference information used to separate the four channels.

Simply put, CD-4 consists of four recorded signals (LF, LB, RB, RF) using a coding matrix similar to FM broadcast stereo multiplexing.

In the CD-4 system, the quadraphonic audio was divided into left and right channels, which were recorded orthogonally in the vertical plane of the disc groove, which is the case with normal stereo. The CD-4 record track is broader than a conventional stereo track, so the playing time is less than that of a conventional stereo record.

The audio frequencies (20 Hz to 15 kHz), often referred to as the sum channel, would contain the sum of the left front plus left back signals in the left channel and the sum of the right front plus the right back signals in the right channel. In other words, when observing the audio frequencies only, the record appeared to have an ordinary stereo recording.

Along with this audio, a separate 30 kHz carrier was recorded on each groove wall. The carrier on each side carried the difference signal for that side. This was the information that enabled a combined signal to be resolved into two separate signals. For the left carrier it would be left front minus left back, and for the right carrier it would be the right front minus the right back. These audio signals were modulated onto the carriers using a special FM-PM-SSBFM (frequency modulation-phase modulation-single sideband frequency modulation) technique. This created an extended carrier frequency range from 18 kHz to 45 kHz for the left and right channels.

The algebraic addition and subtraction of the sum and difference signals would then yield compatible and discrete quadraphonic playback.

The CD-4 encoding/decoding matrix

Quadraphonic channel		Sum channel (0,02 to 15 kHz)		Difference channel (18 to 45 kHz)
Left front	=	LF + LB	+	LF − LB
Left back	=	LF + LB	−	LF − LB
Right front	=	RF + RB	+	RF − RB
Right back	=	RF + RB	−	RF − RB

== Software decoding ==
In October 2018 Pspatial Audio introduced software decoding of CD-4/Quadradisc recordings without the need of a specialized hardware demodulator. This technology was introduced with version 3.1.8 of the Stereo Lab software package.

== Quadracast ==
There was also a similar FM radio system called Quadracast. But CD-4 (and quadraphonic audio in general) failed due to late U.S. Federal Communications Commission approval of FM quadraphonic broadcasting.
