= Sansui Electric =

Japanese manufacturer

Sansui Electric Co., Ltd.
- Native name: 山水電気株式会社
- Type: Public
- Traded as: TYO: 6793
- Industry: Electronics
- Founded: 3 June 1947; 79 years ago Tokyo, Japan
- Defunct: 2014
- Headquarters: Tokyo, Japan
- Key people: Takeshi Nakamichi, president
- Products: Audio-visual and communication equipment, home appliances, information equipment,
- Total assets: 5,794 million Yen (Fiscal year ended December 31, 2006)
- Subsidiaries: Sansui Electric SPV Private Limited, Sansui Sales Pte. Ltd.
- Website: www.sansui-global.com

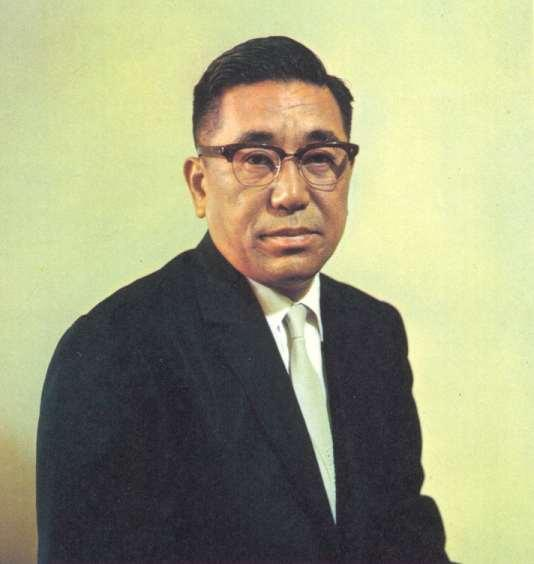
Founder of Sansui, Kosaku Kikuchi

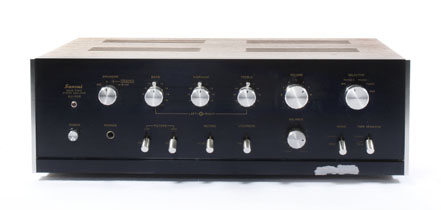
AU-666 amplifier 1970

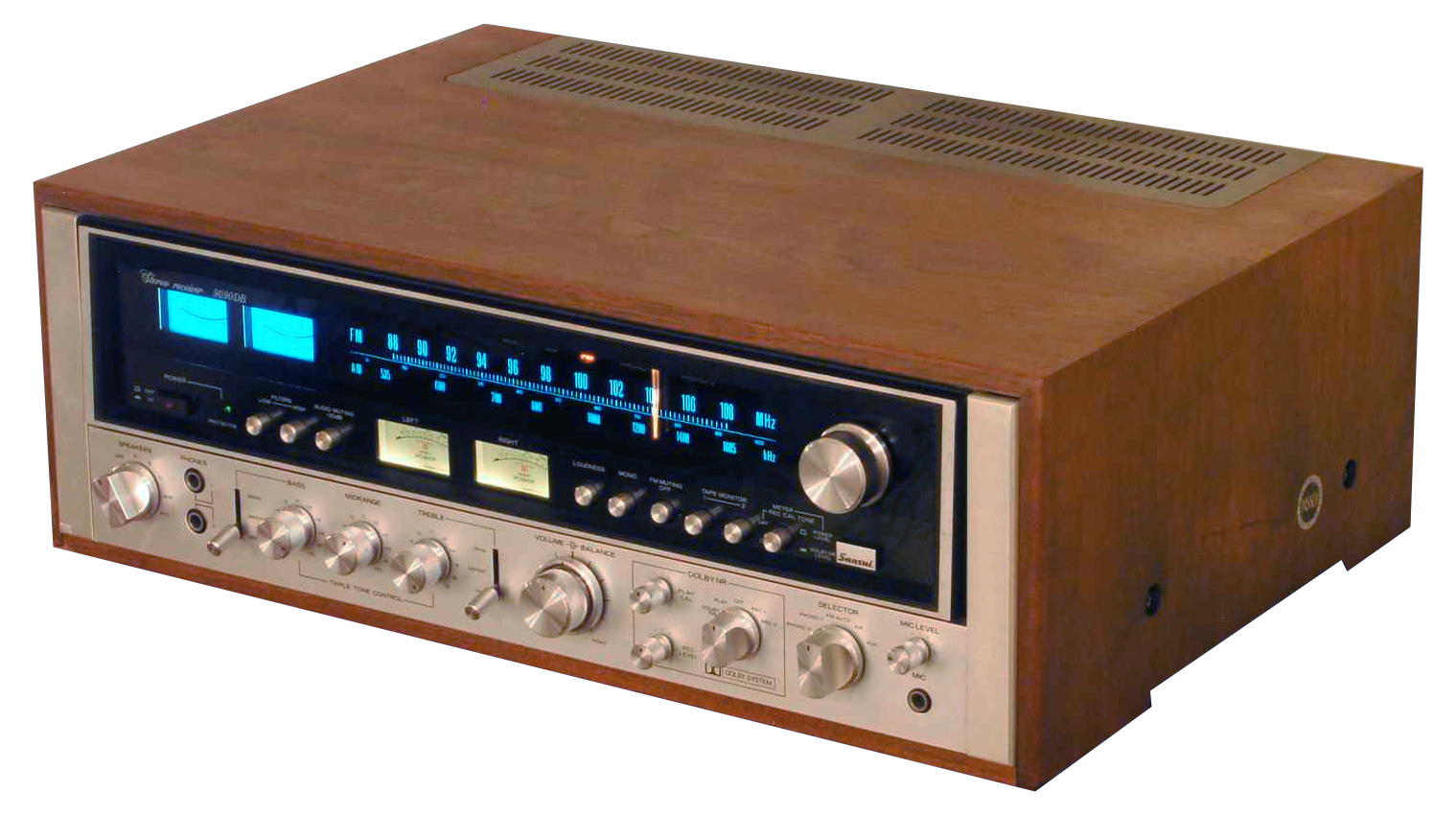
Sansui 9090DB Stereo Receiver (1975)

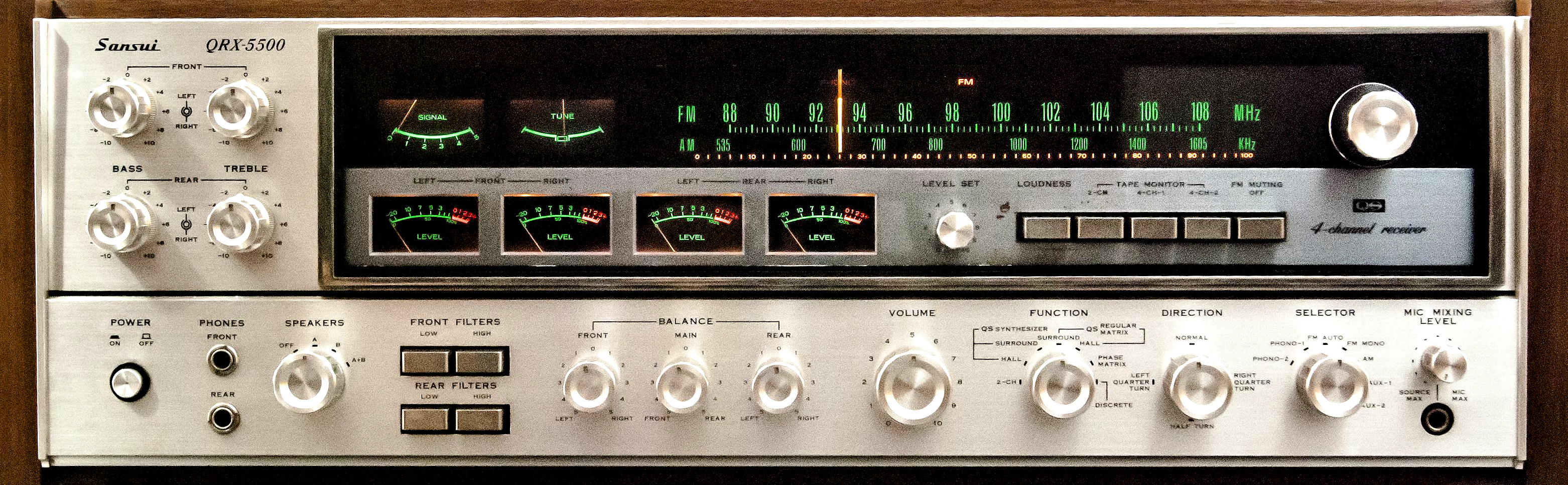
Sansui QRX-5500 Quadrophonic Receiver

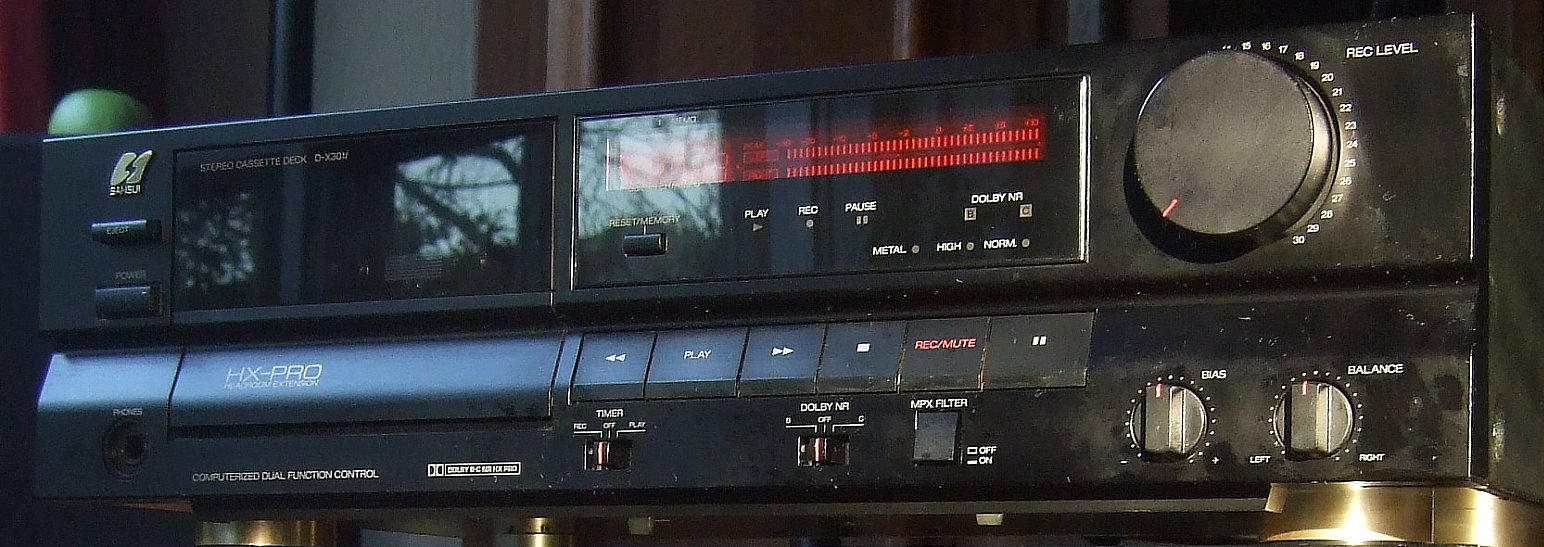
D-X301i Cassette Deck with last logo from 1987

Sansui Electric Co., Ltd. (山水電気株式会社, Sansui Denki Kabushiki-gaisha) was a Japanese manufacturer of audio and video equipment headquartered in Tokyo, Japan. It was active internationally up until the late 2000s; in 2014 the Chinese company Grande Holdings acquired the rights to license the Sansui name outside Japan.

== History ==
The company was founded in Tokyo in 1947 by Kosaku Kikuchi, who had worked for a radio parts distributor in Tokyo before and during World War II. Due to the poor quality of radio parts Kikuchi had to deal with, he decided to start his private radio part manufacturer facility in December 1944 in Yoyogi, Tokyo. He chose transformers as his initial product line. Kikuchi's thought was "Even with higher prices, let's make the higher quality of products."

In 1954 manufacturing pre-amp, main-amp kits, as well as finished amplifiers which used tubes, was started; in 1958 Sansui introduced the first stereo tube pre- and main amplifiers. By the 1960s Sansui had developed a reputation for making serious audio components. They were sold in foreign markets through that and the next decade. Sansui's amplifiers and tuners from the 1960s and 1970s remain in demand by audio enthusiasts. Since 1965 the matte-black-faced AU-series amplifiers were released. In 1967 Sansui produced its first turntable.

In 1971, Sansui introduced the Quadphonic Synthesizer QS-1, which could make simulated four-channel stereo from two-channel sources. Sansui developed the QS Regular Matrix system, which made it possible to transmit four-channel Quadraphonic sound from a standard LP. The channel separation was only 3 dB, but because of the human way of hearing it sounded relatively good. In 1973, Sansui introduced the more advanced QS Vario Matrix decoder with 20 dB separation. The SQ system developed by Columbia/CBS was the most popular matrix system. But later QS decoders could also play SQ records. Some Sansui receivers could also play the most advanced four-channel system: CD-4 (or Quadradisc) by Japanese JVC and American RCA. Most big record companies used either SQ or CD-4, but Decca used the Sansui QS system. The 2-channel-range was extended by tape machines and cassette decks. The company also produced the Sansui AU-11000 in the mid-70s .

In 1974 Kosaku Kikuchi resigned, and vice-president Kenzo Fujiwara became president.

In the late 1970s, the first-generation '07' models included the dual-mono power supply AU-517 and AU-717, and the second generation featured the updated AU-719, 819, and 919 were released. The separate pre-amp/power-amp CA-F1/BA-F1 topped the model range along with the AU-X1 integrated amplifier (1979).

In the UK around 1982, the Sansui AU-D101 amplifier and its more powerful sibling the AU-D33, were acclaimed by audiophiles and were so well matched to a pair of KEF Coda III speakers that they could be bought as a set from some outlets. These amplifiers used a complex feed-forward servo system which resulted in very low second order harmonic distortion. Despite this success, Sansui failed to follow up with further mass-market audiophile components.

As the mid-1980s arrived, sales were lost to competitors (Sony, Pioneer, Matsushita's Technics). Sansui began to lose visibility in the United States around 1988, and then focused on manufacturing high-end components in Japan. The company began to manufacture high-end television sets and other video equipment, but ceased exportation. In the late 1990s, the company's brand was used on video equipment manufactured by other companies. The current manufacturer of the rebranded sets is Orion Electric, based in Osaka and Fukui, Japan. Its U.S. subsidiary markets products under the Sansui brand, among others. Sansui is thus a mere umbrella brand at present. This radical change in Sansui's corporate identity has resulted in a notable change in its product quality as consumers now tend to consider Sansui a mass-market brand rather than a maker of high-end electronics.

Sansui had developed the patented α(alpha)-x balanced circuit, that used in its high power amplifier along with the so-called double diamond differential, another patent for balanced driver stage. Lately Sansui had developed a turntable, P-L95R, with a handling similar to CD-players; it allowed to play both sides of the record without turning it.

Its latest amplifiers included the a-u alpha series like the 707´and 907 (1987) au-x1111 (round about 1990) and others; b-2105 mos with a weight of 37 kg (82 lb) (1999) Sansui ended its Japanese production of high-end amplifiers some time between 2002 and 2005. In 2001 the headquarters in Shi-Yokohama was closed.

The Japanese website as HiFi-manufacturer was last updated January 2014; Sansui went out of business in 2014. Sansui's sales had shriveled to just 40.4 million yen by 2010. The 2003 founded Sansui Electric China Co Ltd stayed longer than 2014. In Japan, consumer product maker Doshisha has the right to manufacture and sell under the Sansui brand. Outside of Japan, the brand belongs to Nimble Holdings of Hong Kong.

== See also ==
- List of phonograph manufacturers
