= Headshell =

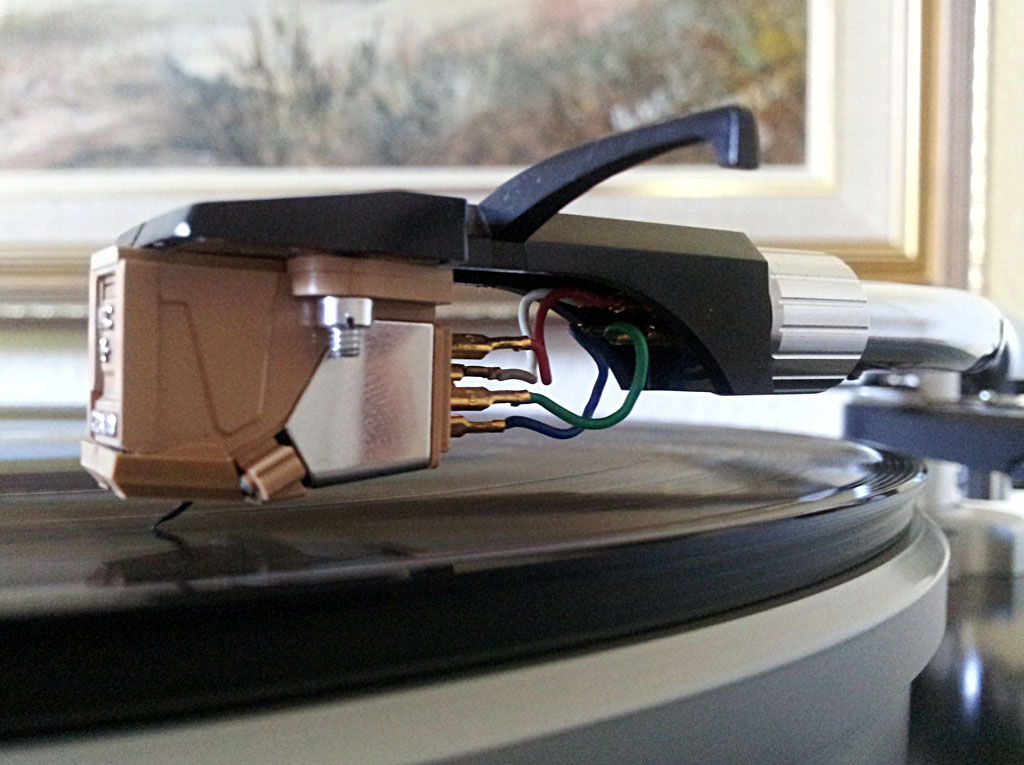
A headshell

A headshell is a head piece designed to be attached to the end of a turntable's or record player's tonearm, which holds the cartridge. Standard cartridges are secured to the headshell by a couple of 2.5 mm bolts spaced 1/2" apart. Older, non-metric cartridges used #2 (3/32") bolts.

Some headshells are designed to allow variable weights to be attached. For example, the H4-S Stanton headshell comes with 2g and 4g screw-in weights. Extra weight can be useful to prevent skipping if the DJ is scratching the record. The pin diameter of most if not all of the headshells is in the exact ⌀ 1.0mm.

== H-4 Bayonet Mount ==
Most headshells use a standard H-4 Bayonet Mount, which will fit all S shape tonearms. The bayonet has a standard barrel whose dimensions are 8 mm diameter and 12 mm length, with its four pins connected to the four colour-coded head-shell lead wires.

== Headshell lead wires colours ==
The colour standards for the contact connections are as follows:

- White: Left channel cartridge positive.
- Blue: Left channel cartridge negative.
- Red: Right channel cartridge positive.
- Green: Right channel cartridge negative.
