= UD-4 =

Discrete 4-channel quadraphonic gramophone record format developed by Nippon Columbia

- Media type: Phonograph record
- Encoding: Analog signal
- Capacity: Four audio channels
- Read mechanism: phono cartridge
- Developed by: Nippon/Columbia (Denon)
- Usage: Audio storage
- Released: 1974

UD-4 was a discrete four-channel quadraphonic sound system for phonograph records introduced by Nippon Columbia (Denon) in 1974. This system had some similarities with the more successful CD-4 process introduced by JVC and RCA in 1972.

Only about 35 to 40 LP album titles were encoded in this format, and it was marketed only in the UK, Europe and Japan. Most of these releases were marketed by the Denon label.

The UMX (universal matrix) standard used for UD-4 contains two subsystems:

- BMX (quadrasonic, two channel matrix), a basic 4-2-4 matrix decoder (different from QS Regular Matrix);
- QMX (four channel matrix), a discrete 4-4-4 system (adding band-limited localization information encoded with high frequency carrier signals similar to the CD-4 system).

The UD-4 process modulated both BMX and QMX into a single record. This way, a BMX decoder could be used to decode quadraphonic sound using an existing stereo record player, while by using a special phono cartridge and a specialized UD-4 demodulator discrete supplementary QMX channels could be extracted (enhancing directional resolution).

In theory this allowed backward compatibility with existing players and records, but the system suffered from incompatibility with regular stereo playback due to phase differences between the left and right channels.

Phono cartridge set-up for UD-4 playback was less critical than in CD-4, because the high frequency carrier signals were not as high as those found in the CD-4 system.
