= Sansui AU-11000 =

Amplifier

The Sansui AU-11000 is a home audio integrated amplifier built by Japanese audio electronics manufacturer Sansui during the mid 1970s. The amplifier is known across the audiophile community for its high-output power and low Total harmonic distortion (THD).

The AU-11000 has an output power of 110 watts-per-channel, and was one of the earliest home audio amplifiers to use multiple transistors per channel using a "Push-Pull" method to add more amplification power. The AU-11000 uses independent circuitry in the amplification process, in such a way that, each individual channel has its own circuits. This means everything from the power supply to the bias control board all have 2 identical and independent circuits per channel to separate the 2 stereo channels. This also minimizes the Total Harmonic Distortion within the amplifier down to 0.08%.

The AU-11000 has its own power protection built into the amplifier. When the power switch is turned to the "ON" position, the power light comes on as green for a second, and turns red for a few seconds until the power protection circuitry has confirmed it is safe to power-up. Once it has finished, the power light turns and remains green until the amplifier is turned off. The AU-11000 also has its own block diagram printed on the upper-front casing.

Sansui designed the AU-11000 with the input, output and speaker terminals on the sides of the unit. The rear of the unit has the power cord and outlets only.

The AU-11000 has features such as a logarithmic volume control, a 3-position level-set muting, a -20db mute switch, 3-position high & low filters, 3-Band Linear Bass/Midrange/Treble controls, 3 optional frequency settings for Bass & Treble controls, 3-position Tone Selection, A & B Speakers, Tape Input/Output control, 5-position mono-stereo selector switch, Tuner input, 2 Auxiliary inputs, 2 phono inputs, 2 rear 'always on' power outlets and 1 switched power outlet that is controlled by the units main power switch. There is an XLR input for Tape 2, and a spring-loaded ground connection plug.

There are a few variations of the Sansui AU-11000. Many units share some of the same internal components as the less-powerful AU-9900, such as the Bias Board [F-2580] and the Power Supply Board [F-2566], though the AU-11000 has much larger power capacitors. Some units have an 'A' at the end of the model number (AU-11000A), indicating it has 120 Watts-per-channel and a linear volume control.

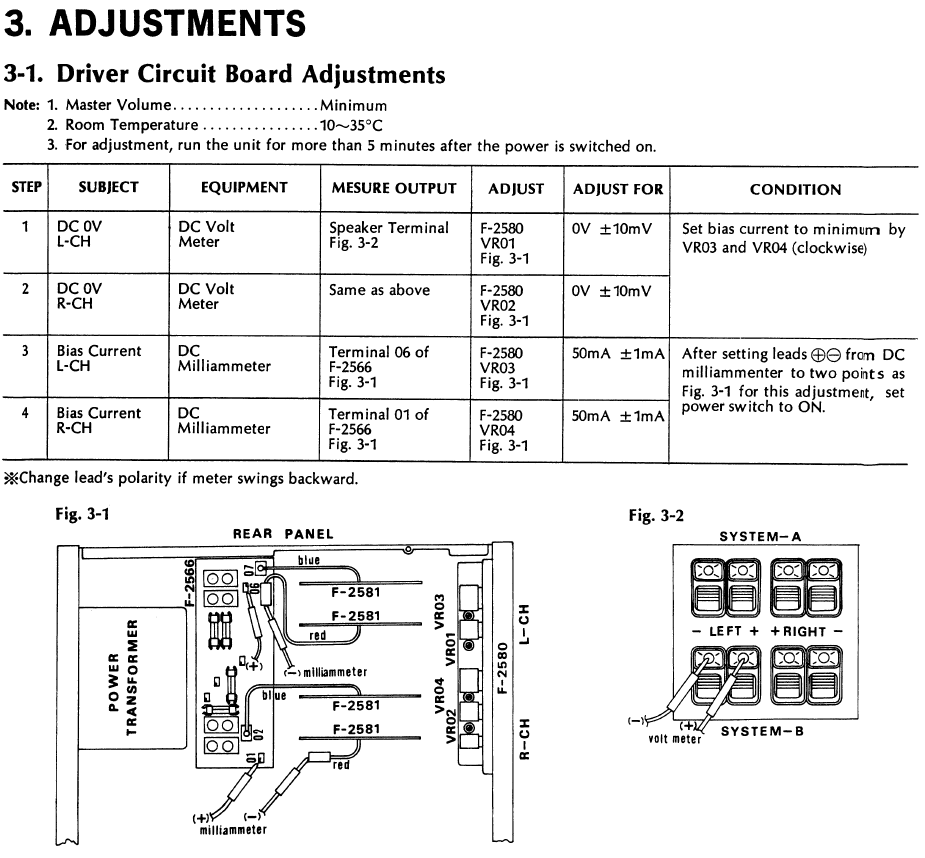
DC Offset & Current Bias Adjustments for models with the F-2580 Bias Board

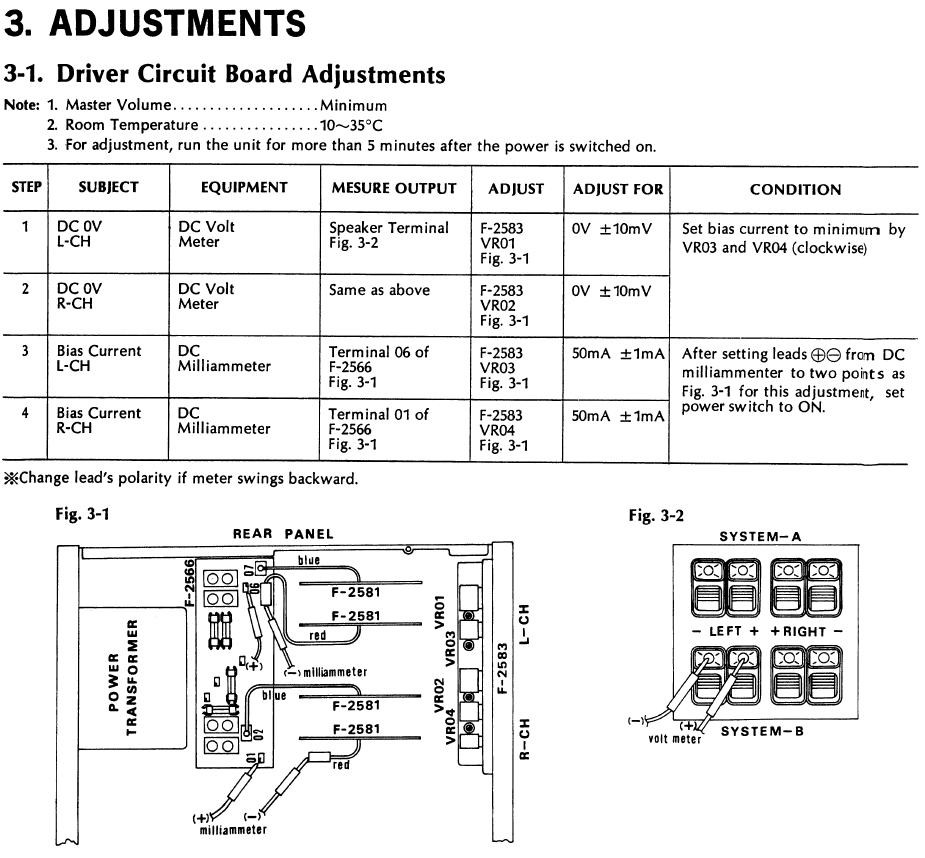
DC Offset & Current Bias Adjustments for models with the F-2583 Bias Board

There is a lot of discussion among the home audio community about how to properly set the DC Offset & Current Bias within the amplifier. This is not something for the average do-it-yourself'er or handyman, and should be performed by a qualified technician.

AU-11000's with the F-2580 bias board can be adjusted using the service manual. AU-11000's with the F-2583 bias board have VR01 & VR03 switched within the circuit. VR02 & VR04 and also switched respectively. This means that the DC Offset & Current Bias trim locations are switched with one-another on the F-2583, compared to the F-2580.

The Service Manual depicts proper adjustments of the F-2580 only. The picture on the right shows the proper illustration for the F-2583.

The AU-11000 uses 8 TO-3 style power-output transistors, 4 per channel. 2 of the 4 are Sanken 2SC1116 [NPN] transistors, and the other 2 are Sanken 2SA747 [PNP] transistors. Two of the same transistors are paired together onto a single Power Transistor Circuit [F-2581], and are paired with an identical circuit using the 2 different Power Transistors. The 2 circuits function together to power the respective channel using a "Push-Pull" method to create the 110 Watts per Channel. The 2 circuits make up each power amplifier per channel. This makes a total of 8 power-output transistors within the amplifier.

Each amplifier channel has a temperature sensor built-in as part of the power protection circuitry. If the amplifier is too hot, the power protection circuitry will not allow the amplifier to power on. The power protection circuit has (4) 2Amp fuses. There are (4) 7Amp fuses on the power supply board [F-2566]. Since the power supply board is actually 2 identical power supplies (1 per channel), there are 2 fuses per individual power supply.

There is a ground screw inside the front-bezel which links the ground to several of the AU-11000's circuit boards. This is often overlooked when checking the ground connections.
