= Benjamin Bauer =

American acoustic engineer (1913–1979)

Benjamin B. Bauer (originally Baumzweiger; 1913–1979) was a Russian-born American acoustic engineer, who worked for the Shure microphone company and produced over 100 patents. His early work in acoustics led to the development of modern sound technology via the Uniphase Electrical Principle. This principle is the source of the Unidyne Microphone's name and functionality.

== Early life ==
Bauer was born in Odessa, Russian Empire (now Ukraine), in 1913. His family fled Russia after the 1917 Revolution and relocated to Havana, Cuba. At the age of 17, and speaking little English, Bauer moved to New York City to attend the Pratt Institute. After obtaining an Associate Industrial Engineering degree, Bauer matriculated at the University of Cincinnati, pursuing an Electrical Engineering degree. Bauer chose a five-year work/study program and began working as an intern at Shure. When he graduated in 1937, he joined the Shure company in Oak Park, IL, full-time as a transducer development engineer. It was the start of a distinguished career in acoustics and audio that included more than 100 patents.

== Uniphase Principle ==
The year 2013 marked the 75th anniversary of Bauer’s invention of the Uniphase principle while working for Shure Brothers Incorporated, a microphone manufacturer in Chicago. As a newly graduated engineer, the 25 year-old Bauer developed an acoustical method that produced a directional microphone using only one microphone element.

When sound is transmitted through a medium, it must be detected by an object that can convert the inherently mechanical nature of the sound waves into an electric signal. In the human ear, this is accomplished via the organs of the middle ear in conjunction with the hair cells and endolymph of your inner ear. In the Uniphase, sound acts upon the outside of the acoustic diaphragm while it simultaneously enters a phase-shifting acoustic network within the microphone. There, it acts upon the inside of the diaphragm. The diaphragm actuates a transducer converting its motions into equivalent electrical waves: an electric signal that can now be transmitted through an electronic medium like wires. Importantly, in the Uniphase, as sound arrives from the front of the microphone, the inner pressure reinforces the outer pressure, thus allowing noise picked up by the microphone system to be greatly reduced.

This Uniphase principle paved the way for the design of the Shure Unidyne Microphone.

== Shure Unidyne ==
Introduced in 1939, the Shure Unidyne is arguably the most recognized microphone in the world. The Unidyne's instant and lasting success has been attributed by its manufacturer as stemming from the fact that, "It was the first high-quality unidirectional microphone that was affordable and reduced audio issues such as background noise, feedback and excessive reverberation." On Jan 31, 2014, the Unidyne microphone was granted the IEEE award.

== World War II ==
In 1941, Bauer became a naturalized US citizen. During the Second World War, he worked on acoustic equipment for the US Navy, helping to develop a type of microphone called a Controlled Reluctance or Controlled Magnetic Microphone, known more colloquially as a battle-announcer, because it could be used reliably in a variety of weather including extreme conditions.

== CBS and Quadraphonic Sound ==
In 1957, Bauer joined CBS where he helped develop the SQ matrix system stereo quadraphonic sound. He went on to become the vice president and general manager of the CBS Technology Center in Stamford, CT, where he lived until his death in 1979.
