= Ambisonic UHJ format =

Surround sound format

Ambisonic UHJ format is a development of the Ambisonic surround sound system designed to be compatible with mono and stereo media. It is a hierarchy of systems in which the recorded soundfield will be reproduced with a degree of accuracy that varies according to the available channels. Although UHJ permits the use of up to four channels (carrying full-sphere with-height surround), only the 2-channel variant is in current use (as it is compatible with currently-available 2-channel media). In Ambisonics, UHJ is also known as "C-Format".

== UHJ hierarchy ==
Ambisonic B-Format is the standard format for use in the studio. While it is possible to distribute B-Format recordings for decoding and listening by end-users, this is only starting to be more widespread with the advent of software-based players. Traditionally, Ambisonic recordings have been distributed in the form of two-channel discs, CDs etc. using the two-channel version of the UHJ encoding hierarchy, which, unlike B-Format, is designed to be stereo compatible.

UHJ was developed by the Ambisonic team, incorporating work done by the BBC (on their quadraphonic system, Matrix H) and Duane H. Cooper (on Nippon Columbia's UD-4/UMX quadraphonic system) and others, and building on the then-current version of Ambisonics, System 45J. The initials indicate some of sources incorporated into the system: U from Universal (UD-4); H from Matrix H; and J from System 45J.

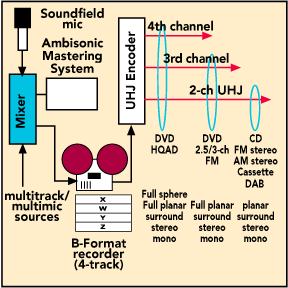
The theoretical path from B-format to the various stereo/mono-compatible UHJ variants. In fact many mixing applications went straight from multitrack to 2-channel UHJ before the advent of digital audio workstations and current Ambisonic mixing developments.

UHJ is a unique hierarchical system of encoding and decoding directional sound information within Ambisonics technology. Depending on the number of channels available, the system can carry more or less information – but at all times, UHJ is fully stereo- and mono-compatible. Up to four channels (L, R, T, Q) may be used.

In its most basic form, two-channel (L, R) UHJ, horizontal (or "planar") surround information can be carried by normal stereo signal channels – CD, FM or digital radio, etc. – which may be recovered by using a UHJ decoder at the listening end. Summing the two channels gives a highly compatible mono signal which is a more accurate representation of the two-channel version than summing a conventional "panpotted mono" source. If a third channel (T) is available, it can be used to give improved localisation accuracy to the planar surround effect when decoded via a three-channel UHJ decoder. The third channel does not have to have full audio bandwidth for this purpose, leading to the possibility of so-called "2½-channel" systems, where the third channel is bandwidth-limited to 5 kHz. The third channel can be broadcast via FM radio, for example, by means of phase-quadrature modulation. This configuration was tested by the Independent Broadcasting Authority (IBA) in the United Kingdom as a method of broadcasting surround recordings. 2½ or three-channel UHJ delivers the same accuracy as three-channel (WXY) B-Format. Adding a fourth channel (Q) to the UHJ system allows the encoding of full surround sound with height, known as Periphony, with a level of accuracy identical to four-channel B-Format.

Although there are some compromises with accuracy of localisation in the two-channel UHJ system, two-channel UHJ is the format commonly used for distribution of Ambisonic recordings. Two-channel UHJ recordings can be transmitted via all normal stereo channels and any of the normal two-channel media can be used with no alteration.

It is stereo compatible in that, without decoding, the listener perceives a stereo image, but one that is significantly wider than conventional stereo (see Super Stereo). The left and right channels can also be summed for a very high degree of mono-compatibility. Replayed via a UHJ decoder, the surround capability is revealed.

UHJ hierarchy
Number of channels	Decoder?	Capabilities	Typical applications	Channels	B-Format equivalent	Original designation*
4	Yes	Full-sphere surround	DVD, HD disc	LRTQ	WXYZ	PHJ
3	Yes	Full horizontal surround	DVD, HD disc	LRT	WXY	THJ
"2½"	Yes	Full horizontal surround	FM radio	LR band-limited T	WXY	SHJ
2	Yes	Horizontal surround	CD, Stereo Radio; General 2-channel media	LR	-	BHJ
2	No	Stereo	CD, Stereo Radio; General 2-channel media	LR	-	-
1	No	Mono	Radio	LR (summed)	-	-

*These designations are seldom used today

== Decoding UHJ ==
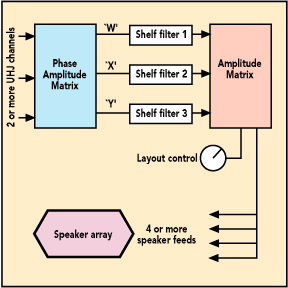
Basic outline structure of a UHJ decoder.

A UHJ decoder, primarily for the 2-channel format, was the original component required for consumer experience of Ambisonics. When the system was first being promoted the push was two-pronged: on the one hand encouraging record companies to endorse the system and release discs (this was, in retrospect, ill-advised: record companies had been burned by quad systems and were not in a mood to endorse anything; and in any case, the people to persuade were engineers, producers and high-profile artists, who could use Ambisonic mixing equipment on sessions at will, just as they had a free rein in using other outboard studio equipment), while on the other hand encouraging hardware manufacturers to sign up as Ambisonic licensees and include decoders in their equipment.

Inside a UHJ decoder, the signals are processed in a phase amplitude matrix to recover a set of signals that resembles B-Format. In most cases the signal will actually be B-Format, but in the case of 2-channel UHJ there is insufficient information available to be able to reconstruct a true B-Format signal, only something that behaves in a similar way.

The information is then passed to an amplitude matrix that develops the speaker feeds, via a set of shelf filters, which improve the accuracy and performance of the decoder in smaller listening environments (they can be omitted in larger-scale applications). Ambisonics was designed to suit actual living rooms and practical speaker positions: most living rooms are rectangular and as a result the basic system was designed to decode to four loudspeakers in a rectangle, with sides between 1:2 (width twice the length) and 2:1 (length twice the width) in length, thus suiting the majority of living rooms. A layout control is generally provided to allow the decoder to be configured for the loudspeaker positions – an important aspect of Ambisonic replay where it differs from other surround systems: the decoder is specifically configured for the size and layout of the speaker array. The layout control may take the form of a rotary knob, a 2-way (1:2,2:1) or a 3-way (1:2,1:1,2:1) switch.

Four speakers is the minimum required for horizontal surround decoding and while this is suitable for a typical consumer environment, larger spaces require more speakers to give full surround localisation.

== Super stereo ==
A disadvantage of the use of 2-channel UHJ is that to obtain a surround effect the listener requires an Ambisonic UHJ decoder. These have traditionally not been widely available, but have become so as plugins on modern PC equipment. However, listeners to a 2-channel UHJ signal without a decoder notice a "super stereo" effect. Because of the inter-channel phase relationships inherent in the encoding scheme, the listener experiences stereo that is often significantly wider than the loudspeakers (see also § Undecoded UHJ below).

At the same time, a feature of domestic UHJ decoders has been the inclusion of a super stereo feature. This allows conventional stereo signals to be "wrapped around" the listener, using some of the capabilities of the decoder. A control is provided that allows the width to be varied between mono-like and full surround. This provides a useful capability for a listener to get more from their existing stereo collection.

Both features were used as selling points in the early days of Ambisonics, and especially Ambisonic mixing. They helped to overcome a "chicken and egg" situation where record companies were reluctant to release Ambisonic recordings because there were few decoders in the marketplace, while hi-fi manufacturers were unwilling to license and incorporate Ambisonic UHJ decoders in their equipment because there was not very much mainstream released content. On the one hand, it was worth having a decoder because you could get more out of your existing (stereo) record collection; while on the other it was worth making UHJ recordings because even people without a decoder could gain appreciable benefits.

== Undecoded UHJ ==
In a world in which the majority of listeners do not have Ambisonic decoders, most listeners to 2-channel UHJ-encoded material will be listening undecoded.

Some engineers have preferred the perceived additional spaciousness, width and stability of undecoded 2-channel UHJ to conventional panpotted stereo mix techniques. The late John Timperley, for example, used the UHJ Transcoder (a simple method of Ambisonic mixing) extensively and produced several series of UHJ recordings even though he was fully aware that few people would ever hear them decoded, and mixed material deliberately for the best undecoded result. Unfortunately these recordings have not yet been fully documented.

Similarly, on the Tina Turner album, Break Every Rule, the backing vocals are in fact UHJ encoded – and in this case there is no point in the listener decoding the tracks, because the rest of the mix is in regular panpotted stereo and contains no surround information – the vocals were encoded purely for the spacious effect without decoding.

When listening to undecoded 2-channel UHJ material, the rear information is folded down over the front stage at 3 dB down, so that the soundstage retains some degree of 'distance' between front and rear. For example, a sound panned around the listener in surround will, when auditioned undecoded, appear more distant as it passes across the 'rear'; in addition, the interchannel phase relationships associated with rear localisation make the sound attempt to appear behind the listener as a result of a form of 'aural decoding'. However, while this is generally effective in the case of Ambisonically mixed content, in the case of material recorded with a soundfield microphone (SFM) system the ambience, for example in a concert-hall, may be sufficiently high in level when undecoded to make the recording appear over-reverberant, where this is not the case when the UHJ is decoded into surround. This has been cited in the past as a criticism of some SFM recordings by some record reviewers: the problem can be ameliorated by careful mic array positioning (e.g. a position closer to the musicians).

== UHJ production techniques ==
Creating (typically 2-channel) UHJ recordings is a simple matter of passing B-Format signals through a UHJ encoder and recording the result. These might be derived from soundfield microphone recordings or from mixdown. In addition, mixes can be created directly in UHJ by using a UHJ Transcoder, such as that offered by Audio & Design Recordings in the 1980s, along with other Ambisonic mixing hardware (see Ambisonic mixing: Legacy hardware). The Transcoder both encoded B-Format into 2-channel UHJ and in addition allowed a stereo front stage and a stereo rear stage (both with adjustable widths) to be transcoded direct to 2-channel UHJ, while other units facilitated the production of B-Format mixes that could be encoded into UHJ with the Transcoder.

A significant number of 2-channel releases were made with this equipment, including several albums on the KPM production music library label, and commercial releases such as Steve Hackett's Till We Have Faces, The Alan Parsons Project's Stereotomy, Paul McCartney's Liverpool Oratorio, Frank Perry's Zodiac, a series of albums on the Collins Classics label, and others, most of which are available on CD.

In addition, an enormous collection of UHJ releases, originally on vinyl and later on CD, which is still being added to today, has been created by British independent classical record company Nimbus Records. Nimbus was one of the earliest Ambisonic licensees.

The lack of availability of 4-track mastering equipment led to a tendency (now regretted by some of the people involved) to mix directly to 2-channel UHJ rather than recording B-format and then converting it to UHJ for release. The fact that one could mix direct to 2-channel UHJ with nothing more than the transcoder made this even more tempting. As a result, there is a lack of legacy Ambisonically mixed B-format recordings that could be released today in more advanced formats (such as G-Format). However, the remastering – and in some cases release – of original 2-channel UHJ recordings in G-Format has proved to be surprisingly effective, yielding results at least as good as the original studio playbacks, thanks primarily to the significantly higher quality of current decoding systems (such as file-based software decoders) compared to those available when the recordings were made.

== UHJ encoding and decoding equations ==
=== Encoding ===
$$S = 0.9396926*W + 0.1855740*X$$
$$D = j( -0.3420201  *W + 0.5098604 * X) + 0.6554516 * Y$$
$$Left = (S + D) / 2.0$$
$$Right = (S - D) / 2.0$$
$$T = j(-0.1432*W + 0.6512*X) - 0.7071*Y$$
$$Q = 0.9772*Z$$
where $j$ is a +90° phase shift

=== Decoding ===
For four-channel UHJ:

$$S = (Left + Right)/2.0$$
$$D = (Left - Right)/2.0$$
$$W = 0.982*S + j*0.197(0.828*D + 0.768*T)$$
$$X = 0.419*S - j(0.828*D + 0.768*T)$$
$$Y = 0.796*D - 0.676*T + j*0.187*S$$
$$Z = 1.023*Q$$
where $j$ is a +90° phase shift

For three-channel UHJ:

$$S = (Left + Right)/2.0$$
$$D = (Left - Right)/2.0$$
$$W = 0.982*S + j*0.197(0.828*D + 0.768*T)$$
$$X = 0.419*S - j(0.828*D + 0.768*T)$$
$$Y = 0.796*D - 0.676*T + j*0.187*S$$
where $j$ is a +90° phase shift

For two-channel UHJ:

$$S = (Left + Right)/2.0$$
$$D = (Left - Right)/2.0$$
$$W' = 0.982*S + j*0.164*D$$
$$X' = 0.419*S - j*0.828*D$$
$$Y' = 0.763*D + j*0.385*S$$
where $j$ is a +90° phase shift

Note that two-channel UHJ requires the player to use different shelf filters than for three- and four-channel UHJ (and B-Format); $W'$, $X'$ and $Y'$ are used to indicate that the result of decoding is not the same as the original B-format (Gerzon refers to this as E-format).

== See also ==
- Ambisonics
- Stereophonic sound
- Nimbus Records
