= Jim Fosgate =

American audio engineer (1937–2022)

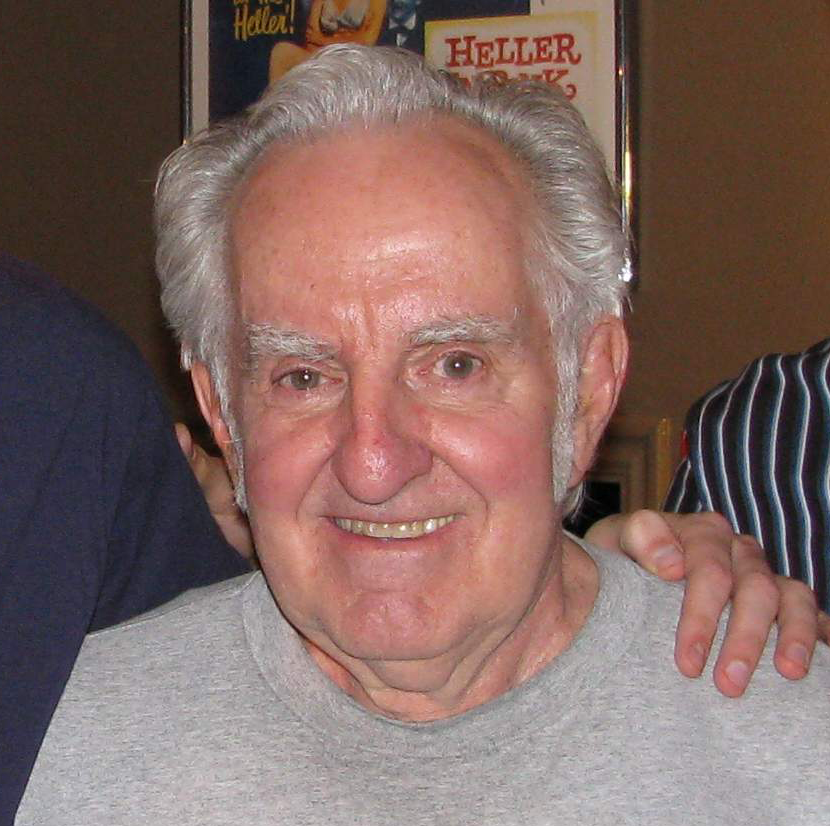
- Fosgate in his summer home in Utah
- Born: December 5, 1937
- Died: December 7, 2022 (aged 85)
- Occupations: Inventor, engineer
- Known for: Inventing surround sound for television, Dolby Pro Logic II, high-end SQ 4-2-4 analog quad audio decoding

James M. Fosgate (December 5, 1937 – December 7, 2022) was an American inventor, engineer and businessman. The self-taught son of a television and radio repairman, Fosgate invented the first car amplifier in 1973 and founded Fosgate Electronics, now called Rockford Fosgate. After his departure from Rockford Fosgate in 1981, Fosgate remained active in the audio world, running Fosgate Laboratories and leading the team that created Dolby Pro Logic II. Fosgate was also the developer of one of the finest quadraphonic decoders, the TATE II 101A (see Stereo Quadraphonic for details), in collaboration with Peter Scheiber and Martin Willcocks, which was superseded by his 3601 decoder.

== Audio career ==
Collaborating with four channel matrix pioneer Peter Scheiber early on gave Fosgate's company the edge to become one of the leaders in the Dolby Surround market.

In 2003 Fosgate received an Emmy Award for the development of surround sound for television.
