= Stereo Quadraphonic =

Matrix 4-channel quadraphonic sound system

SQ Quadraphonic
- SQ Quadraphonic logo
- Media type: Phonograph record
- Encoding: Analog signal
- Capacity: Four audio channels
- Read mechanism: phono cartridge
- Usage: Audio storage

SQ Quadraphonic ("Stereo Quadraphonic") is a matrix 4-channel quadraphonic sound system for vinyl LP records. It was introduced by CBS Records (known in the United States and Canada as Columbia Records) in 1971. Many recordings using this technology were released on LP during the 1970s.

Record companies who adopted this format include: Angel, CTI, Columbia (internationally called CBS Records), EMI, Epic, Eurodisc, Harvest, His Master's Voice, Seraphim, Supraphon and Vanguard.

SQ Quadraphonic speaker layout

With matrix formats, the four sound channels (forward left, forward right, back left, back right) are converted (encoded) down to two channels (left, right). These are then passed through a two-channel transmission medium (usually an LP record) before being decoded back to four channels and presented to four speakers.

The SQ encoding is based on the work by Peter Scheiber and further developed by Benjamin Bauer. His basic formula used 90 degree phase shift circuitry to enable enhanced 4-2-4 matrix systems to be developed. This 4-2-4 process could not be accomplished without some information loss. That is to say, the four channels produced at the final stage were not truly identical to those with which the process had begun.

In 4-2-4 matrix four channel stereo, the rear speakers should be of the same or almost same size quality and have the same or almost same frequency range as the front speakers.

== Usage ==
The early SQ decoders could not produce more than 3 dB of separation from front to back. Early "Front-rear logic" circuits were introduced to enhance separation to 12 dB and later "Full logic" circuits 20 dB, but both provided poor performance, very noticeable gain-pumping and an unstable 'swaying' sound field.

The SQ system also faced resistance from broadcasters since, while essentially a two-channel system and stereo-compatible, it could have substantial mono compatibility problems, which posed serious problems with all televisions and monophonic radios of the era. By the time that the most advanced logic system was introduced for SQ, the Tate Directional Enhancement System, by Martin Willcocks and Peter Scheiber, realized into the superb Tate II 101A decoder by Jim Fosgate, "quad" was already considered a failure.

Of Pink Floyd's The Dark Side of the Moon, engineer Alan Parsons recalled: "It was certainly the band's intention, when we recorded the album, to mix in quad. All the effects on 'Money' and other tracks were recorded on four-track, so they could be heard in true quad on the final record… But by the time the mix stage was upon us, quad hadn't really taken off as a medium in the way it was expected to, so it was a little bit of an anticlimax. Then, as we know, the whole thing died a death".

Harman Kardon had an SQ decoder that could change the separation so it was as low between the front channels as the separation between front and rear channel.

Some SQ recordings have been released on Compact Disc, especially on early CD editions, on which the original master mix is encoded in SQ. One example is the 1974 live album Lotus by Santana.

SQ is compatible with two-channel stereo, but there are some problems. The front channels are totally compatible, the rear channels have a smaller width. But the great problems are the sounds between front and rear. They will turn to the left and the middle point of the room goes only to the left speaker in 2-channel stereo.

Basic SQ Encoding Matrix
	Left Front	Right Front	Left Back	Right Back
Left Total	1.0	0.0	-j0.7	0.7
Right Total	0.0	1.0	-0.7	j0.7

j = + 90° phase-shift^{[i]}

To provide mono-compatibility a variation on this matrix was proposed:

Modified SQ Encoding Matrix
	Left Front	Right Front	Left Back	Right Back
Left Total	1.0	0.0	0.707	-j0.707
Right Total	0.0	1.0	-j0.707	0.707

j = + 90° phase-shift^{[i]}

The four channels were encoded and decoded normally in this proposal, but the back-center channel was coded in phase and therefore decoded in front-center.

This system made good sense, as, in the absence of a quad decoder, SQ-encoded records would play almost as normal stereo records, and CBS stated their desire to maintain excellent compatibility between their SQ-encoded records and standard stereo systems, but in practice, there were compatibility problems: When played on two-channel stereo equipment, the front channels sound like ordinary two-channel stereo channels; the rear channels are narrower than the front channels. A problem occurs with the sounds placed in the center rear. The point directly behind the listener is out of phase in stereo playback, causing it to disappear in one-channel mono listening. The left-rear and right-rear points are 3 dB lower in two-channel stereo listening, and 6 dB lower in mono listening.

The SQ record track is broader than a conventional stereo track, so the maximum playing time is lower than that of a conventional stereo record.

== Records ==
Columbia/CBS Records had a catalog of four channel records called QUADRAPHONIC with a golden frame on the album covers. These records were encoded with the SQ system. But there was also a parallel QUADRAPHONIC catalogue with 8-track tape (mainly aimed for car stereo equipment). But these quadraphonic tapes were made in discrete four channel stereo. That gave the whole CBS Quadraphonic project a higher status.

== Variations ==
=== Universal SQ ===
In 1976, Benjamin Bauer integrated matrix and discrete systems into USQ, or Universal SQ (others had done this with their quad systems too).

It was a hierarchical 4-4-4 discrete matrix that used the SQ matrix as the baseband for discrete quadraphonic FM broadcasts using additional difference signals called "T" and "Q". For a USQ FM broadcast, the additional "T" modulation was placed at 38 kHz in quadrature to the standard stereo difference signal and the "Q" modulation was placed on a carrier at 76 kHz. For standard 2-channel SQ Matrix broadcasts, CBS recommended that an optional pilot-tone be placed at 19 kHz in quadrature to the regular pilot-tone to indicate SQ encoded signals and activate the listener's Logic decoder. CBS argued that the SQ system should be selected as the standard for quadraphonic FM, because in FCC listening tests of the various four channel broadcast proposals the 4:2:4 SQ system, decoded with a CBS Paramatrix decoder, had outperformed 4:3:4 (without logic) as well as all other 4:2:4 (with logic) systems tested, approaching the performance of a discrete master tape within a very slight margin. At the same time, the SQ "fold" to stereo and mono had been preferred by most test listeners to the stereo and mono "fold" of 4:4:4, 4:3:4 and all other 4:2:4 encoding systems.

=== Tate DES (Directional Enhancement System) ===
The Directional Enhancement System, also known as the Tate DES, was an advanced decoder for SQ (although it could be made to work with any matrix or kernel system) that enhanced the directionality of the basic SQ matrix.

It matrixed the four outputs of the SQ decoder to derive additional signals and compared their envelopes to detect the predominant direction and degree of dominance. A processor section, implemented outside of the Tate IC chips, applied variable attack/decay timing to the control signals and determined the coefficients of the "B" (Blend) matrices needed to enhance the directionality. These were acted upon by analog multipliers in the Matrix Multiplier IC's, to multiply the incoming matrix by the "B" matrices and produce outputs in which the directionality of the predominant sounds was increased. Since the DES could recognize all three directions of the Energy Sphere simultaneously, and enhance the separation, it had a very open and 'discrete' sounding soundfield.

In addition, the enhancement was done with sufficient additional complexity that all non-dominant sounds were kept at their proper levels.

Dolby used the Tate DES IC's in their theater processors until around 1986, when they developed the Pro Logic system. Unfortunately, delays and problems kept the Tate DES IC's from the market until the late 1970s, and only two consumer decoders were ever made that employed them: the Audionics Space & Image Composer and the Fosgate Tate II 101A.

The Fosgate used a faster, updated version of the IC, called the Tate II, and additional circuitry that provided for separation enhancement around the full 360° soundfield, using the Haas effect. In order to maintain the highest quality levels, Fosgate used hand-sorted ICs and 1% -tolerance components, and each decoder was hand-optimized. Unlike earlier Full Wave-matching Logic decoders for SQ that varied the output levels to enhance directionality, the Tate DES cancelled SQ signal crosstalk as a function of the predominant directionality, keeping non-dominant sounds and reverberation in their proper spatial locations and at their correct level. The 101A was later replaced with the 3601. The Fosgates were audiophile units of rather high expense and limited availability.

SQ records could give some amount of quadraphonic effect when played through a QS Regular Matrix decoder, although only accurately decoded playback is via a correctly designed SQ decoder. The word Quadraphonic was often - but not always - used as a synonym to the SQ system. Sometimes the SQ system (and other similar matrix systems) were called Phase Matrix to distinguish them from the QS system and similar systems that collectively were called Regular Matrix.

== Hardware ==
Some SQ decoders include:

- Sony SQD-1000
- Realistic SQ-II
- Sony SQD-2050
- Lafayette SQ-L, SQ-W
- Marantz SQA-2 Module
- Sony SQD-2020/2010
- Fosgate/Tate II 101a
- Tesla AZQ 100

== Notes ==
^i The 90° phase-shift is applied to every frequency of the recording with a Hilbert transform.
