= Peter Scheiber =

- Born: April 30, 1935; Croton-on-Hudson, New York, U.S.
- Died: January 18, 2023 (aged 87); Bloomington, Indiana, U.S.
- Education: Oberlin Conservatory of Music
- Occupation: Founder of Scheiber quadraphonic system

Peter Scheiber was a classically trained musician and audio engineer. He was considered to be the originator of multichannel matrix audio formats, a mathematical formula used to convert four audio channels into two and back again.

Scheiber was also the inventor of the 360-degree spatial decoder. Like Lou Dorren, Scheiber was an early pioneer of multi-channel sound. It has been written that Scheiber pioneered the surround sound technology that is used in theaters today and referred to as Dolby Surround.

In matrix quadraphonic systems four channels are converted (encoded) down to two channels. These two matrixed channels are recorded onto tape or vinyl record. Reproduction occurs via a two-channel stereo transmission medium - in most cases a vinyl record - these are decoded back to four channels and reproduced via four loudspeakers.

== Musician ==
Scheiber, an Oberlin College music graduate, obtained a full scholarship to study with the first-chair players of the Boston Symphony at Tanglewood. He was 22 years of age when he got to study with Chicago Symphony's first bassoonist. He also played first-chair in the Chicago Chamber Orchestra. During his professional career, he played with the Ottawa Philharmonic and Dallas Symphony orchestras. Around 1977 his bassoon was stolen from the trunk of his car and according to the May 2007 article in Indianapolis Monthly and he never replaced it. Also later being called on to play there would be reasons not to play such as a missing reed or music.

== Audio career ==
Peter Scheiber was born in Croton-on-Hudson in New York in 1935. He grew up in Peekskill. From an early age, passionate about music and technology, he had a workbench in his bedroom for experimenting with his gadgets. He later earned a scholarship at Tanglewood Music Center and played with the Chicago Symphony. Later, as a professional, he was a member of orchestras in Ottawa and Texas.

In 1967 Scheiber, then a 32-year-old bassoonist, came up with the idea of encoding four channels of sound in two channels and decoding them back to four. He sold a patent license to CBS.

Peter Scheiber would eventually take legal action against Dolby Laboratories and Dolby Laboratories Licensing Corp for infringement of his patents.

During his career he worked with Jim Fosgate of Fosgate Electronics and Tate surround technology.

== Legal battle ==
As of October 2003, the 68-year-old Sheiber had more or less become a recluse for eight years due to his legal battle with Dolby Laboratories. This was over Dolby's development of a surround sound system for motion picture industry which was based on his invention. After some difficulties, he was able to secure some royalty payments from Dolby and Harman International which lasted from 1983 to late 1994. He received over a million dollars. The companies eventually stopped paying Scheiber as they claimed that the patents had expired and he wasn't due any more money. In June 2002, Seventh Circuit Appeals Judge Richard Posner ruled against him, which was his biggest defeat.

Scheiber was upset that Dolby and others were making millions from the technology he pioneered.
