= QS Regular Matrix =

Matrix 4-channel quadraphonic sound system developed by Sansui Electric

Logo for the Sansui 'QS' matrix quadraphonic sound system

Quadraphonic Sound (originally called Quadphonic Synthesizer, and later incorrectly referred to as RM or Regular Matrix) was a phase amplitude matrix 4-channel quadraphonic sound system for phonograph records.

QS Regular Matrix speaker layout

It provided 4 channel output (Front Left, Front Right, Back Left and Back Right) from a specially encoded standard stereophonic track. The system was based on technology created by Peter Scheiber, but further developed by engineer Ryosuke Ito of Sansui in the early 1970s.

The technology was freely licensed and was adopted by many record labels including ABC, Advent, Candide, Command, Decca, Impulse, Longines, MCA, Passport, Pye, Vanguard and Vox. More than 600 LP record titles using this technology were released on vinyl during the 1970s.

RM (Regular Matrix) was often used a synonym for the 'Sansui QS', 'Toshiba QM' and 'Nippon Columbia QX' matrix systems that were previously launched before the advent of the RM specification in 1973. Although none of the three previous matrices were compatible with the new RM specification, and with Toshiba and Nippon Columbia withdrawing their 'further RM incompatible' matrix systems from the market, Sansui's QS system was unofficially labelled by some record labels as RM, until the situation was clarified to those responsible for the mislabeling.

The QS matrix has been found to offer the advantages of excellent diagonal separation and stereo compatibility, and although the adjacent speaker separation is only 3 dB, this symmetrical distribution produces more stable quadraphonic images than some other matrix systems. The QS record track width is as narrow as a conventional stereo track, so the maximum playing time is the same as conventional stereo records.

== History ==
As early as 1969 engineer and musician Peter Scheiber developed a matrix system very similar to QS. He also was instrumental in many improvements to SQ quality, in collaboration with Martin Willcocks and Jim Fosgate.

In the early 1970s Sansui introduced the Four Channel Synthesizer Decoder QS-1 and the QSE-1 Encoder based on the QS system in Japan and debuted export to the United States in March 1971. The channel separation was only 3 dB, but because of the human way of hearing it sounded relatively good.

In 1973 Sansui introduced the QS Vario Matrix decoder with 20 dB separation in all directions (The Vario Matrix decoder could also play SQ records on Phase Matrix mode with 6 dB separation. Later Sansui used front-rear logic on the SQ mode.). Two outboard decoders, the QSD-1 and QSD-2, as well as the QRX series of larger receiver-amplifiers, incorporated this matrix and up-conversion. Sansui's QS decoders also had good stereo-to-quad capabilities, wrapping the L-R panorama to LB-LF-RF-RB in a horseshoe topology. (The Vario Matrix decoder could synthesize four channel sound with high separation - at least 12 dB.) British sound pioneer John Mosely, co-built the Sansui system and would go on to pioneer Quintaphonic Sound.

The system was often incorrectly called RM (Regular Matrix) when used on amplifiers or receivers by other trademarks than Sansui. Many Japanese brands like Pioneer or Kenwood had matrix decoders with two modes: - SQ and RM. JVC had two modes on their matrix decoder called Matrix 1 and Matrix 2. That decoder could play both SQ and QS records, but it was a simplified decoder. QS records could also be played on Marantz Vari-Matrix system. (European trademarks like Philips or Bang & Olufsen had only decoders for SQ or both SQ and CD-4 - but not QS.) QS records could give some quadraphonic effect, although far from accurate, when played on an SQ decoder.

In June 2018 electronic musician Suzanne Ciani released the album LIVE Quadrophonic using a system "based" on the principles of the QS Regular Matrix system. A limited edition of 227 boxed set copies were released as a 12-inch 45 RPM phonograph record. The box also includes a hardware decoder for correct playback, made by Involve Audio. This was one of the first new quadraphonic phonograph recordings to be released since the late 1970s.

=== Quintaphonic Sound ===
A five-channel system based on QS, named Quintaphonic Sound, was designed and built by John Mosely following his work on Sansui's Quadraphonic package and used for the 1975 film Tommy. The left and right 35mm magnetic soundtracks were QS encoded to create four channels around the cinema audience, while the centre mag track was assigned to the speaker behind the screen. The magnetic FX track was unused. This channel layout (5.0) was similar to the now common 5.1 surround sound configuration.

== Usage ==
QS Encoding Matrix
	Left Front	Right Front	Left Back	Right Back
Left Total	0.924	0.383	j0.924	j0.383
Right Total	0.383	0.924	-j0.383	-j0.924

j = + 90° phase-shift

QS Decoding Matrix
	Left Total	Right Total
Left Front	0.924	0.383
Right Front	0.383	0.924
Left Back	-j0.924	j0.383
Right Back	j0.383	-j0.924

j = + 90° phase-shift

When played on a conventional two channel stereo equipment, the front channels are narrower than ordinary two channels because of the low separation. But the rear channels are heard from points outside the ordinary stereo spectrum. So the QS record gives a totally broader stereo picture than conventional two channel stereo. The point behind the listener is out of phase when played in two channel stereo and extinct in one channel mono listening. In mono the volumes of left and right points behind the listener is reduced with only 3 dB (in SQ 6 dB).

== Hardware ==
The QSD-1 Quadphonic Synthesizer (a rack-mount module) was introduced in 1971, soon followed by the smaller, boxy QSD-2.

As of 2018, an Australian company called Involve Audio has designed and updated a modern decoder based upon QS principles which, while not exactly mathematically comparable to QS, is capable of decoding QS and other matrix encodes as well as or better than vintage hardware.

== Bibliography ==
- R. Ito and S. Takahashi, Characteristics of the Sansui QS Vario-Matrix (presented at the Audio Engineering Society 43rd Convention, Los Angeles, September 1972) read on-line
- R. Ito, “Proposed universal encoding standard for compatible four-channel matrixing,” JAES April 1972. (First presented at the 41st A.E.S Convention, 7 October 1971). Also reprinted in “Quadraphony” Anthology, AES 1975 pp. 125–131.
- Sansui QS Tech Manual (QSD-1) read on-line
