= Magnetic cartridge =

Electromechanical transducer used in the playback of records

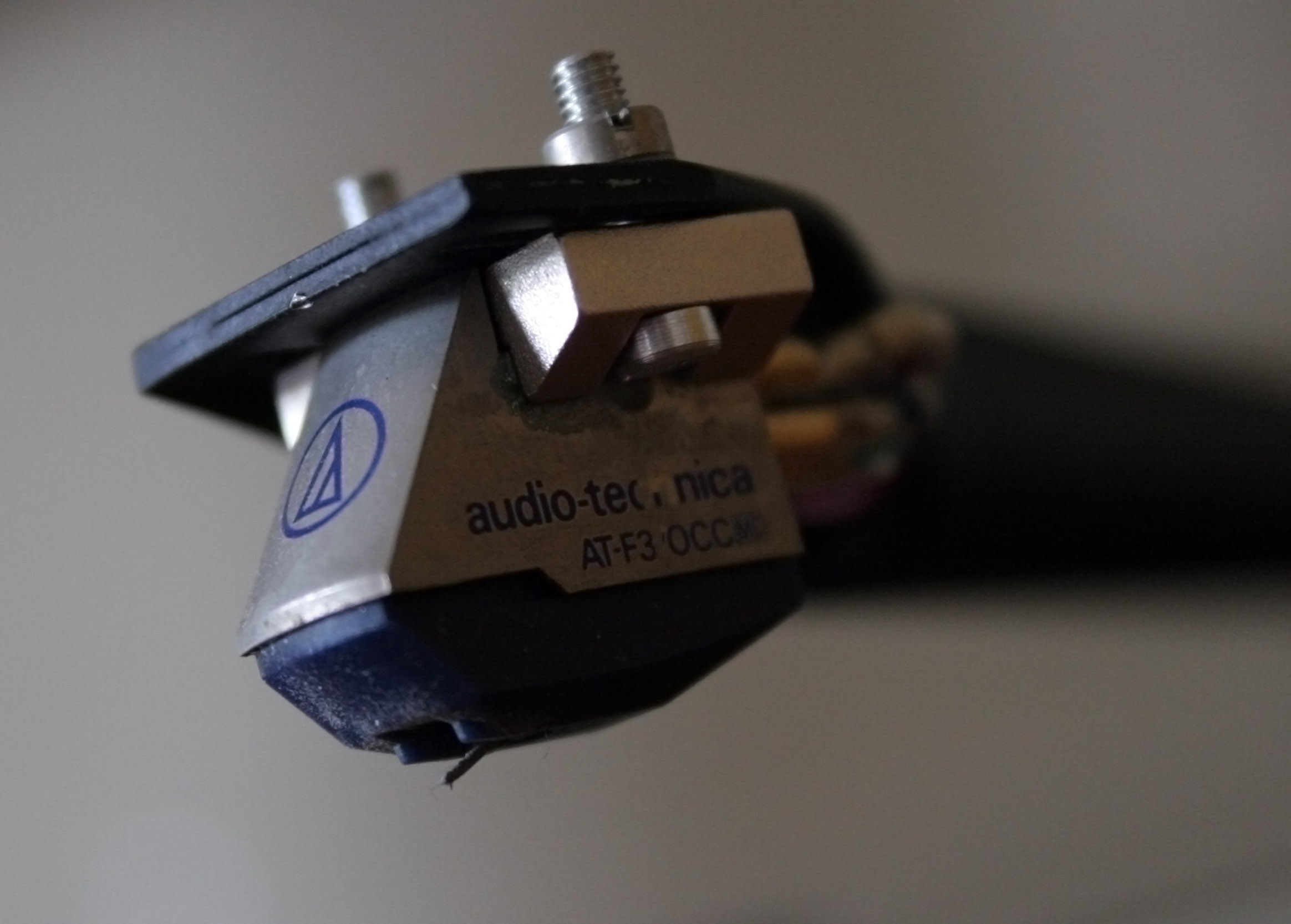
An Audio Technica AT-F3 moving coil phono cartridge

A magnetic cartridge, more commonly called a phonograph cartridge or phono cartridge or (colloquially) a pickup, is an electromechanical transducer that is used to play phonograph records on a turntable.

The cartridge contains a removable or permanently mounted stylus, the tip - usually a gemstone, such as diamond or sapphire - which makes physical contact with the record's groove. In popular usage and in disc jockey jargon, the stylus, and sometimes the entire cartridge, is often called the needle. As the stylus tracks the serrated groove, it vibrates a cantilever on which is mounted a permanent magnet which moves between the magnetic fields of sets of electromagnetic coils in the cartridge (or vice versa: the coils are mounted on the cantilever, and the magnets are in the cartridge). The shifting magnetic fields generate an electrical current in the coils. The electrical signal generated by the cartridge can be amplified and then converted into sound by a loudspeaker.

== History ==
The first commercially successful type of electrical phonograph pickup was introduced in 1925. Although electromagnetic, its resemblance to later magnetic cartridges is remote: it employed a bulky horseshoe magnet and used the same single-use steel needles which had been standard since the first mechanical transfer disc record players appeared in the 1890s. This early type of magnetic pickup dominated the market well into the 1930s: by the end of that decade it had been superseded by the comparatively lightweight piezoelectric crystal pickup type, however the use of short-lived disposable metal needles remained standard. During the years immediately following World War II, as old record players with very heavy pickups were replaced, precision-ground and long-lasting stylus tips made of sapphire or the exotic hard metal osmium were increasingly popular. However, records made for home use were still made of the same abrasive shellac compound formulated to rapidly wear down the points of steel needles to fit the groove.

The introduction of the 33 1/3 rpm record LP "album" in 1948 and the 45 rpm record "single" in 1949 prompted consumers to upgrade to a new multi-speed record player with the required smaller-tipped "microgroove" stylus. Sapphire and diamond then became the standard stylus tip materials. At first, the new styli came installed in smaller, lighter piezoelectric crystal or ceramic cartridges of the general type found in inexpensive self-contained portable record players throughout the phonographic era. Ceramic cartridges continue to be used in most of the "retro" and compact record players currently being made, in part because they are comparatively robust and resistant to damage from careless handling, but mostly because they are inexpensive. However, during the 1950s, a new generation of small, lightweight, highly compliant magnetic cartridges appeared and quickly found favor among high-fidelity enthusiasts because of their audibly superior performance. The high compliance also reduced record wear. They soon became standard in all but the cheapest component audio systems and are the most common type of pickup cartridge in use today.

== Design and construction ==
The cartridge consists of several components: the stylus, cantilever, magnets, coils and body. The stylus is the part that, when in use, is the interface with the record surface and tracks the modulations in the groove. It is typically made of a small polished diamond or other industrial gemstone. The cantilever supports the stylus, and transmits the vibrations from it to the coil/magnet assembly. The former is typically made of boron or aluminium, and previously beryllium although some manufacturers market models with exotic gemstone cantilevers. Most models of moving magnet cartridges have detachable stylus–cantilever sub-assemblies that allow for their replacement without the need to remove and replace the entire cartridge when the stylus has become worn.

Coupled to the tonearm, the cartridge body's function is to give the moving parts a stationary platform so that they can track the groove with precision.

== Types ==
In high-fidelity systems, crystal and ceramic pickups have been replaced by the magnetic cartridge, using either a moving magnet or a moving coil.

Compared to the crystal and ceramic pickups, the magnetic cartridge usually gives improved playback fidelity and reduced record wear by tracking the groove with lighter pressure. Magnetic cartridges use lower tracking forces and thus reduce the potential for groove damage. They also have a lower output voltage than a crystal or ceramic pickup, in the range of only a few millivolts, thus requiring greater amplification.

=== Moving Magnet (MM) and Moving Iron (MI) cartridges ===
In a moving magnet cartridge, the stylus cantilever carries a tiny permanent magnet, which is positioned between two sets of fixed coils (in a stereophonic cartridge), forming a tiny electromagnetic generator. As the magnet vibrates in response to the stylus following the record groove, it induces a tiny current in the coils.

Because the magnet is small and has little mass, and is not coupled mechanically to the generator (as in a ceramic cartridge), a properly adjusted stylus follows the groove more faithfully while requiring less tracking force (the downward pressure on the stylus).

Moving iron and induced magnet types (ADC being a well-known example) have a moving piece of iron or other ferrous alloy coupled to the cantilever (instead of a magnet), while a permanent, bigger magnet is over the coils, providing the necessary magnetic flux.

=== Moving Coil (MC) cartridges ===
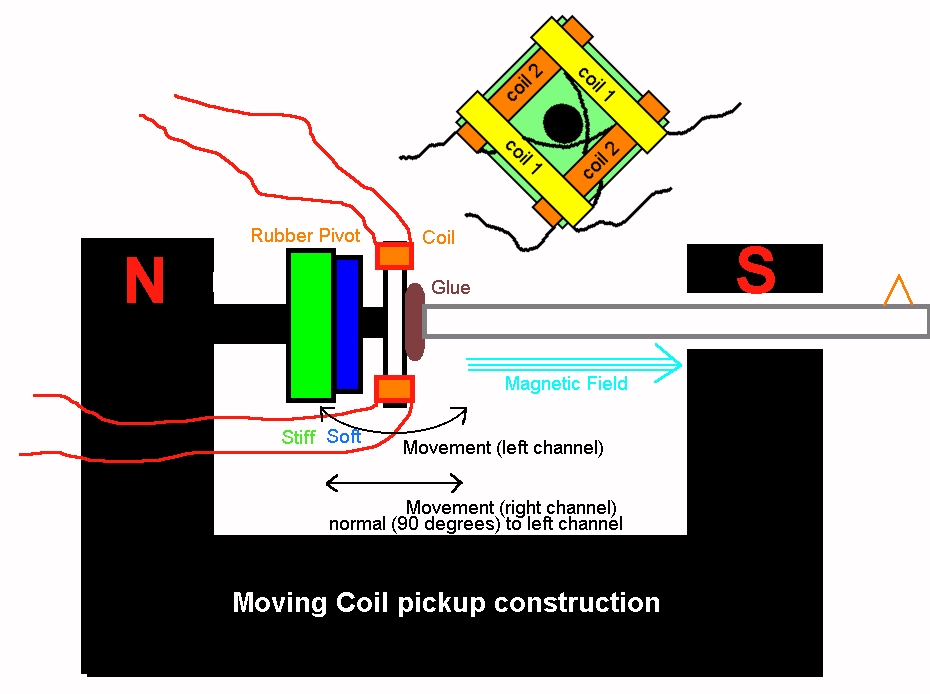
Diagram of moving coil cartridge, showing essential parts

The MC design is again a tiny electromagnetic generator, but (unlike an MM design) with the magnet and coils reversed: the coils are attached to the cantilever, and move within the field of a permanent magnet. The coils are tiny and made from very fine wire.

Since the number of windings that can be supported in such an armature is small, the output voltage level is correspondingly small. The resulting signal is only a few hundred microvolts, and thus more easily swamped by noise, induced hum, etc. Thus it is more challenging to design a preamplifier with the extremely low noise inputs needed for moving-coil cartridge, therefore a "step up transformer" is sometimes used instead.

However, there are available many "high output" moving coil cartridges that have output levels similar to MM cartridges.

Moving coil cartridges are extremely small precision instruments and are therefore generally expensive, but are frequently preferred by audiophiles due to subjectively better performance.

=== Moving Micro Cross (MMC) cartridges ===
The MMC design was invented and patented by Bang & Olufsen. The MMC cartridge is a variation of the Moving Iron (MI) design. Magnets and coils are stationary while a micro cross moves with the stylus, thereby varying the distances between the arms of the cross and the magnets. It is claimed that the MMC design allows for superior channel separation, since each channel's movements appear on a separate axis.

=== Moving Magnet vs. Moving Coil ===
Moving magnet cartridges are more commonly found at the 'lower-end' of the market, while the 'higher-end' tends to be dominated by moving coil designs. The debate as to whether MM or MC designs can ultimately produce the better sound is often heated and subjective. The distinction between the two is often blurred by cost and design considerations - e.g. can an MC cartridge requiring another step-up amplification outperform well made MM cartridges that need simpler front-end stages?

- MC cartridges offer very low inductance and impedance, which means that the effects of capacitance (in the cable that goes from the cartridge to the preamp) are negligible, unlike MM cartridges, which comparatively sport very high inductance and impedance. In the latter, cable capacitance can negatively affect the flatness of frequency response and linearity of phase response. This would account for a potential sonic advantage to MC types.
- It is generally believed that MC cartridges sport lower moving masses. However, quality MM cartridges are able to offer as low or lower moving mass than some MC cartridges. For example, the state-of-the-art Technics EPC-100CMK4 with 0.055 mg of effective tip mass, of moving magnet design. Comparatively, the popular Denon DL-301 moving coil cartridge has an effective tip mass of 0.270 mg.
- To discriminate cartridges by engine (MC vs MM) overlooks the fact that the stylus tip shape (conical vs elliptical vs advanced shapes), mounting (bonded vs nude), cantilever material (aluminum vs boron vs beryllium) and cantilever design (solid rod vs rolled tube) have a significant influence in the sound, and this may account for more variation of sound quality than the engine type used.

MM cartridges generally have output of 3-6 mV, compatible with the MM inputs of preamplifiers. MC cartridges come in two varieties, low output (usually < 1.0 mV) and high output (more than 1.5 mV); there are also some with very low output (0.3 mV or less). High output MC cartridges are a concession to compatibility with older preamp MM inputs; low output MC cartridges may generate excessive noise or have insufficient preamp gain to drive amplifiers to their rated output if used on MM inputs. Most solid state preamplifiers have separate high gain, low noise MC inputs to accommodate these. Cartridges with very low output need a separate pre-phono amplification stage before input to an MC or MM preamplifier stage.

=== "London Decca" Cartridges ===
The Decca phono cartridges were a unique design, with fixed magnets and coils. The stylus shaft was composed of the diamond tip, a short piece of soft iron, and an L-shaped cantilever made of non-magnetic steel. Since the iron was placed very close to the tip (within 1 mm), the motions of the tip could be tracked very accurately. Decca engineers called this "positive scanning". Vertical and lateral compliance was controlled by the shape and thickness of the cantilever. Decca cartridges had a reputation for being very musical; however early versions required more tracking force than competitive designs - making record wear a concern.
