= Stereo-4 =

Matrix 4-channel quadraphonic sound system

Stereo-4 speaker layout

Stereo-4, also known as EV (from Electro-Voice) or EV-4, was a matrix 4-channel quadraphonic sound system developed in 1970 by Leonard Feldman and Jon Fixler.

The system was heavily promoted by RadioShack stores in the United States, and some record companies released LP albums encoded in this format. It was the first commercial quadraphonic sound system for LP records.

== Development ==
The original EV system was compatible with the Dynaquad DY system, and is related to Sansui's QS Regular Matrix system. The EV and QS records are very close to each other—it would take an expert to tell them apart by ear. EV decoders were sometimes used to produce pseudo 4-channel effects from 2-channel stereo recordings.

In 1973 Electro-Voice signed an agreement with Columbia/CBS Records to build a new universal decoder that could decode both SQ and EV records with good results. It could even decode QS records—again, with good results. EV later suggested the same coefficients for an encoder, but no records were ever produced with the so-called EV Version 2 System. EV more or less disappeared after the SQ Stereo Quadraphonic system was introduced by Columbia/CBS Records in the United States.

== Surround Matrix ==
EV used different sets of coefficients for encoding and decoding. Most other systems have decode coefficients that mirror the encode coefficients. Therefore the EV Stereo-4 matrix was something in between a 2-2-4 derived system and a 4-2-4 matrix system.

Stereo-4 encoding matrix	Left Front	Right Front	Left Back	Right Back
Left Total	1.0	0.3	1.0	-0.5
Right Total	0.3	1.0	-0.5	1.0

Stereo-4 decoding matrix	Left Front	Right Front	Left Back	Right Back
Left Total	1.0	0.2	1.0	-0.8
Right Total	0.2	1.0	-0.8	1.0

== Records ==
Partial list of LP records released with EV encoding.

- Hollins and Starr: Sidewalks Talking 1970 (Ovation Records)
- Realistic: Stereo-4 Encoded Sound Effects & Demonstration Tape (Realistic)
- Morris Knight: Three Quintets for Brass; Toccata for Brass Quintet & Tape (New York Brass Quintet)
- David Burge: Serenade for Musical Saw & Orchestra
- Bill Perkins: Textures for Musical Saw & Percussion
- Jim Turner: Well Tempered Saw (Turner)
- Beaver & Krause: All Good Men (Warner Bros)
- Beaver & Krause: Gandharva (Warner Bros)
- Hollins and Starr: Sidewalks Talking (Fallout)
- Bob Crewe Generation: Let Me Touch You (Crewe)
- Keith Droste: Big Band Moog (Realistic)
- Ben Lanzaroni: Quadraphonic (McConnell Records)
- Mary Travers: Mary (Warner Brothers)
- Various Artists - Introducing 4 Channel EV STEREO-4 (SAMPLER 1971 album number OD/1, Ovation Records)

The Ovation Records label initially used the EV or Stereo-4 matrix, but later changed to QS Regular Matrix.
