= Matrix decoder =

Multichannel audio technology

Matrix decoding is an audio technology where a small number of discrete audio channels (e.g., 2) are decoded into a larger number of channels on play back (e.g., 5). The channels are generally, but not always, arranged for transmission or recording by an encoder, and decoded for playback by a decoder. The function is to allow multichannel audio, such as quadraphonic sound or surround sound to be encoded in a stereo signal, and thus played back as stereo on stereo equipment, and as surround on surround equipment – this is "compatible" multichannel audio.

== Process ==
Matrix encoding does not allow one to encode several channels in fewer channels without losing information: one cannot fit 5 channels into 2 (or even 3 into 2) without losing information, as this loses dimensions: the decoded signals are not independent. The idea is rather to encode something that will both be an acceptable approximation of the surround sound when decoded, and acceptable (or even superior) stereo.

== Notation ==
The notation for matrix encoding consists of the number of original discrete audio channels separated by a colon from the number of encoded and decoded channels. For example, four channels encoded into two discrete channels and decoded back to four-channels would be notated:

4:2:4

Some methods derive new channels from the existing ones, with no special encoding of the audio source. For example, five discrete channels decoded to six channels would be notated:

5:5:6

Such derived channel "decoders" may take advantage of the Haas effect, as well as audio cues inherent in the source channels.

Many matrix encoding methods have been developed:

== Hafler circuit (2:2:4) ==
The earliest and simpler form of decoding is the Hafler circuit, deriving back channels out of normal stereo recording (2:2:4). It was used for decoding only (encoding sound was not considered).

=== Decoding matrix ===
Decoding matrix	Left Front	Right Front	Left Back	Right Back
Left Total	1.0	0.0	1.0	-1.0
Right Total	0.0	1.0	-1.0	1.0

== Dynaquad matrix (2:2:4) / (4:2:4) ==
The Dynaquad matrix introduced in 1969 was based on the Hafler circuit, but also used for a specific encoding of 4 sound channels in some albums (4:2:4).

=== Encoding matrix ===
Matrix	Left Front	Right Front	Left Back	Right Back
Left Total	1.0	0.25	1.0	-0.5
Right Total	0.25	1.0	-0.5	1.0

=== Decoding matrix ===
Matrix	Left Front	Right Front	Left Back	Right Back
Left Total	1.0	0.0	0.64	-0.36
Right Total	0.0	1.0	-0.36	0.64

== Electro-Voice Stereo-4 matrix (2:2:4) / (4:2:4) ==
The Stereo-4 matrix was invented by Leonard Feldman and Jon Fixler, introduced in 1970, and sold by Electro-Voice and Radio Shack. This matrix was used to encode 4 sound channels on many record albums (4:2:4).

=== Encoding matrix ===
Matrix	Left Front	Right Front	Left Back	Right Back
Left Total	1.0	0.3	1.0	-0.5
Right Total	0.3	1.0	-0.5	1.0

=== Decoding matrix ===
Matrix	Left Front	Right Front	Left Back	Right Back
Left Total	1.0	0.2	1.0	-0.8
Right Total	0.2	1.0	-0.8	1.0

== SQ matrix, "Stereo Quadraphonic", CBS SQ (4:2:4) ==
Matrix	Left Front	Right Front	Left Back	Right Back
Left Total	1.0	0.0	k0.7	0.7
Right Total	0.0	1.0	-0.7	j0.7

$j = +90^\circ$ phase-shift, $k = -90^\circ$ phase-shift

The basic SQ matrix had mono/stereo anomalies as well as encoding/decoding problems, heavily criticized by Michael Gerzon and others.

An attempt to improve the system lead to the use of other encoders or sound capture techniques, yet the decoding matrix remained unchanged.

=== Position Encoder ===
An N/2 encoder that encoded every position in a 360° circle - it had 16 inputs and each could be dialed to the exact direction desired, generating an optimized encode.

=== Forward-Oriented encoder ===
Matrix	Left Front	Right Front	Left Back	Right Back
Left Total	1.0	0.0	0.7	k0.7
Right Total	0.0	1.0	k0.7	0.7

$j = +90^\circ$ phase-shift, $k = -90^\circ$ phase-shift

The Forward-Oriented encoder caused Center Back to be encoded as Center Front and was recommended for live broadcast use for maximum mono compatibility - it also encoded Center Left/Center Right and both diagonal splits in the optimal manner. Could be used to modify existing 2-channel stereo recordings and create 'synthesized SQ' that when played through a Full-Logic or Tate DES SQ decoder, exhibited a 180° or 270° synthesized quad effect. Many stereo FM radio stations broadcasting SQ in the 1970s used their Forward-Oriented SQ encoder for this. For SQ decoders, CBS designed a circuit that produced the 270° enhancement using the 90° phase shifters in the decoder. Sansui's QS Encoders and QS Vario-Matrix Decoders had a similar capability.

=== Backwards-Oriented encoder ===
Matrix	Left Front	Right Front	Left Back	Right Back
Left Total	k1.0	0.0	k0.7	0.7
Right Total	0.0	j1.0	-0.7	j0.7

$j = +90^\circ$ phase-shift, $k = -90^\circ$ phase-shift

The Backwards-Oriented Encoder was the reverse of the Forward-Oriented Encoder - it allowed sounds to be placed optimally in the back half of the room, but mono-compatibility was sacrificed. When used with standard stereo recordings it created "extra wide" stereo with sounds outside the speakers.

Some encoding mixers had channel strips switchable between forward-oriented and backwards-oriented encoding.

=== London Box ===
It encoded the Center Back in such a way that it didn't cancel in mono playback, thus its output was usually mixed with that of a Position Encoder or a Forward Oriented encoder. After 1972, the vast majority of SQ Encoded albums were mixed with either the Position Encoder or the Forward-Oriented encoder.

=== Ghent microphone ===
In addition, CBS created the SQ Ghent Microphone, which was a spatial microphone system using the Neumann QM-69 mic. The signals from the QM-69 were differenced, and then phase-matrixed into 2-channel SQ. With the Ghent Microphone, SQ was transformed from a Matrix into a Kernel and an additional signal could be derived to provide N:3:4 performance.

=== Universal SQ ===
In 1976, Ben Bauer integrated matrix and discrete systems into USQ, or Universal SQ. It was a hierarchical 4-4-4 discrete matrix that used the SQ matrix as the baseband for discrete quadraphonic FM broadcasts using additional difference signals called "T" and "Q". For a USQ FM broadcast, the additional "T" modulation was placed at 38 kHz in quadrature to the standard stereo difference signal and the "Q" modulation was placed on a carrier at 76 kHz. For standard 2-channel SQ Matrix broadcasts, CBS recommended that an optional pilot-tone be placed at 19 kHz in quadrature to the regular pilot-tone to indicate SQ encoded signals and activate the listeners Logic decoder.

CBS argued that the SQ system should be selected as the standard for quadraphonic FM because, in FCC listening tests of the various four channel broadcast proposals, the 4:2:4 SQ system, decoded with a CBS Paramatrix decoder, outperformed 4:3:4 (without logic) as well as all other 4:2:4 (with logic) systems tested, approaching the performance of a discrete master tape within a very slight margin. At the same time, the SQ "fold" to stereo and mono was preferred to the stereo and mono "fold" of 4:4:4, 4:3:4 and all other 4:2:4 encoding systems.

=== Tate DES decoder ===
The Directional Enhancement System, also known as the Tate DES, was an advanced decoder that enhanced the directionality of the basic SQ matrix.

It first matrixed the four outputs of the SQ decoder to derive additional signals, then compared their envelopes to detect the predominant direction and degree of dominance. A processor section, implemented outside of the Tate IC chips, applied variable attack/decay timing to the control signals and determined the coefficients of the "B" (Blend) matrices needed to enhance the directionality. These were acted upon by true analog multipliers in the Matrix Multiplier IC's, to multiply the incoming matrix by the "B" matrices and produce outputs in which the directionality of all predominant sounds were enhanced.

Since the DES could recognize all three directions of the Energy Sphere simultaneously, and enhance the separation, it had a very open and 'discrete' sounding soundfield.

In addition, the enhancement was done with sufficient additional complexity that all non-dominant sounds were kept at their proper levels.

Dolby used the Tate DES IC's in their theater processors until around 1986, when they developed the Pro Logic system. Unfortunately, delays and problems kept the Tate DES IC's from the market until the late-1970s and only two consumer decoders were ever made that employed them, the Audionics Space & Image Composer and the Fosgate Tate II 101A. The Fosgate used a faster, updated version of the IC, called the Tate II, and additional circuitry that provided for separation enhancement around the full 360 soundfield. Unlike the earlier Full Wave-matching Logic decoders for SQ, that varied the output levels to enhance directionality, the Tate DES cancelled SQ signal crosstalk as a function of the predominant directionality, keeping non-dominant sounds and reverberation in its proper spatial locations at their correct level.

== QS matrix, "Regular Matrix", "Quadraphonic Sound" (4:2:4) ==
Matrix	Left Front	Right Front	Left Back	Right Back
Left Total	0.92	0.38	j0.92	j0.38
Right Total	0.38	0.92	k0.38	k0.92

$j = +90^\circ$ phase-shift, $k = -90^\circ$ phase-shift

== Matrix H (4:2:4) ==
Matrix H Matrix	Left Front	Right Front	Left Back	Right Back
Left Total	-j0.94	-l0.34	+k0.94	+m0.34
Right Total	+l0.34	+j0.94	-m0.34	-k0.94

j = 20° phase-shift k = 25° phase-shift l = 55° phase-shift m = 115° phase-shift

== Ambisonic UHJ kernel (3:2:4 or more) ==
Matrix	W (pressure signal)	X (front-back signal)	Y (left-right signal)
Left Total	0.470 + k0.171	0.093 + j0.255	+0.328
Right Total	0.470 + j0.171	0.093 + k0.255	-0.328

$j = +90^\circ$ phase-shift, $k = -90^\circ$ phase-shift

== Dolby Stereo and Dolby Surround (matrix) 4:2:4 ==
Dolby Stereo and Dolby Surround are also known as Dolby MP, Dolby SVA and Pro Logic.

Dolby SVA matrix is the original name of the Dolby Stereo 4:2:4 encoding matrix.

The term "Dolby Surround" refers to both the encoding and decoding in the home environment, while in the theater it is known "Dolby Stereo", "Dolby Motion Picture matrix" or "Dolby MP". "Pro Logic" refers to the decoder used, there is no special Pro Logic encoding matrix.

The Ultra Stereo system, developed by different company, is compatible and uses similar matrixes to Dolby Stereo.

The Dolby Stereo Matrix is straightforward: the four original channels: Left (L), Center (C), Right (R), and Surround (S), are combined into two, known as Left-total (LT) and Right-total (RT) by this formula:

Dolby Stereo Mix	Left	Right	Center	Surround
Left Total	$1$	$0$	$\frac {1}{\sqrt 2}$	$+j \frac {1}{\sqrt 2}$
Right Total	$0$	$1$	$\frac {1}{\sqrt 2}$	$-j \frac {1}{\sqrt 2}$

where j = 90° phase-shift

The center channel information is carried by both LT and RT in phase, and surround channel information by both LT and RT but out of phase. The surround channel is a single limited frequency-range (7 kHz low-pass filtered) mono rear channel, dynamically compressed and placed with a lower volume than the rest. This allows for better separation of signals.

This gives good compatibility with both mono playback, which reproduces L, C and R from the mono speaker with C at a level 3 dB higher than L or R, but surround information cancels out. It also gives good compatibility with two-channel stereo playback where C is reproduced from both left and right speakers to form a phantom center and surround is reproduced from both speakers but in a diffuse manner.

A simple 4-channel decoder could simply send the sum signal (L+R) to the center speaker, and the difference signal (L-R) to the surrounds. But such a decoder would provide poor separation between adjacent speaker channels, thus anything intended for the center speaker would also reproduce from left and right speakers only 3 dB below the level in the center speaker. Similarly anything intended for the left speaker would be reproduced from both the center and surround speakers, again only 3 dB below the level in the left speaker. There is, however, complete separation between left and right, and between center and surround channels.

To overcome this problem the cinema decoder uses so-called "logic" circuitry to improve the separation. The logic circuitry decides which speaker channel has the highest signal level and gives it priority, attenuating the signals fed to the adjacent channels. Because there already is complete separation between opposite channels there is no need to attenuate those, in effect the decoder switches between L and R priority and C and S priority. This places some limitations on mixing for Dolby Stereo and to ensure that sound mixers mixed soundtracks appropriately they would monitor the sound mix via a Dolby Stereo encoder and decoder in tandem. In addition to the logic circuitry the surround channel is also fed via a delay, adjustable up to 100 ms to suit auditoria of differing sizes, to ensure that any leakage of program material intended for left or right speakers into the surround channel is always heard first from the intended speaker. This exploits the "Precedence effect" to localize the sound to the intended direction.

== Dolby Pro Logic II matrix (5:2:5) ==
Matrix	Left	Right	Center	Rear Left	Rear Right
Left Total	$1$	$0$	$\sqrt{\frac{1}{2}}$	$j\frac\sqrt{3}{2}$	$j\frac{1}{2}$
Right Total	$0$	$1$	$\sqrt{\frac{1}{2}}$	$k\frac{1}{2}$	$k\frac\sqrt{3}{2}$

$j = +90^\circ$ phase-shift, $k = -90^\circ$ phase-shift

The Pro Logic II matrix provides for stereo full frequency back channels. Normally a sub-woofer channel is driven by simply filtering and redirecting the existing bass frequencies of the original stereo track.

== See also ==
- Ambisonic UHJ format
- Dolby Digital
- Dolby Pro Logic
- Haas effect
- Quadraphonic sound
- Surround sound
