= RE20 =

RE20 may refer to:

- Electro-Voice RE20 broadcast microphone, introduced in 1968
- Renault RE20 race car from 1980
- RE-20, a guitar pedal made by Boss to emulate the Roland RE-201 Space Echo
- RE 20, a regional weekend excursion train on the Děčín–Dresden-Neustadt railway
