= Dynaquad =

Quadraphonic sound system

Original Dynaquad diamond surround speaker placement

Dynaquad, or DY, was a matrix decoder 4-channel quadraphonic sound system developed by Dynaco in 1969.

The system originally had four speakers that were arranged in a diamond shape (centre-front, centre-left, centre-rear, centre-right). Initially (first available in 1969 with th Dynaco SCA-80Q amplifier), it was introduced as a derived (2:2:4) four channel "decoding" system based on the Hafler circuit, where the back channels played ambient sounds recovered from standard stereo sounds. As such it wasn't used initially used as an encoding method (a similar approach was used on the Electrovoice Stereo-4 system).

== Commercial usage ==
Updated Dynaquad speaker placement

A simpler form of Dynaquad was adopted, allowing an easy adaptation of existing home setups. The two forward speakers remain in their normal positions, with the user only needing to add two similarly positioned back speakers, forming a square (front-left, front-right, back-left, back-right). Four channel record pioneers Vanguard Records started to use it as an encoding/decoding matrix (4:2:4 format) in 1971. There were few albums released in the format. The competing Stereo-4 system was very similar and can be considered as compatible, as both use very similar decoding matrixes (based on the Hafler circuit).

The left and right rear speakers are connected to the two-channel stereo amplifier via a passive matrix circuit, while the front ones stay directly connected to the amplifier. A lot of stereo material, recorded with a central, non-directional microphone (kidney pattern) placed in front of the orchestra, possessed suitable phase difference stereo signals. When taken from this passive speaker matrix for the rear channels, they produced a quasi-quadraphonic effect at low cost (the patent specifies the use of one fixed 10 ohm resistor and three variable 20 ohm resistors in a star arrangement). Especially for classical music, a fine impression of concert-hall ambiance is achieved with such a system.

Dynaco sold this matrix circuit (Dynaco QD-1 Quadaptor, introduced in 1971)with a large and triple high-wattage potentiometer inside.

Electronic amateurs could build the circuit much more cheaply – e.g., with a four-position switch (four steps in level of the rear sound from min. to max. level) using fixed resistors of, for example, 20, 10, 5 and 0 (short-circuit) ohms. Because, in practice, only the highest level was of any use, a more basic set-up with only the fixed 10 ohm resistor at close-to-zero cost is possible. The system requires relatively flat impedance curves for the rear speakers to work properly, which was often the case in the tube-amplifier days. Tube amplifiers had a constant impedance over a wide range, and worked best with high-efficiency speakers. Later on, when transistor amplifiers were used, speakers tended to lose that design feature. (Lower impedance meant higher power output for these amplifiers, compensating for the lower efficiency of such designs.) The system worked best using a transistor-based stereo amplifier, low-efficiency front speakers, and high-efficiency, constant impedance rear speakers.

== Surround Matrix ==
The encoding was unusual in that, like the Stereo-4 system, it did not use 90° phase shifters.

Dynaquad encoding Matrix	Left Front	Right Front	Left Back	Right Back
Left Total	1.0	0.25	1.0	-0.50
Right Total	0.25	1.0	-0.50	1.0

Dynaquad decoding matrix	Left Front	Right Front	Left Back	Right Back
Left Total	1.0	0.0	0.64	-0.36
Right Total	0.0	1.0	-0.36	0.64

== Records ==
=== Albums ===
- The Flame by The Flames
- 4 Dimensional Sound Demonstration record (D-400)

=== Beach Boys Recordings ===
During 2016, recording engineer Stephen Desper in several online forum posts publicly refuted the common rumour that a number of Beach Boys recordings had been mixed and released in Dynaquad or any other four channel matrix. He confirmed that he had developed a two channel virtual surround matrix that had only been partially realised by the record company on the Beach Boys releases.
