= Hafler circuit =

Derived 4-channel quadraphonic sound system

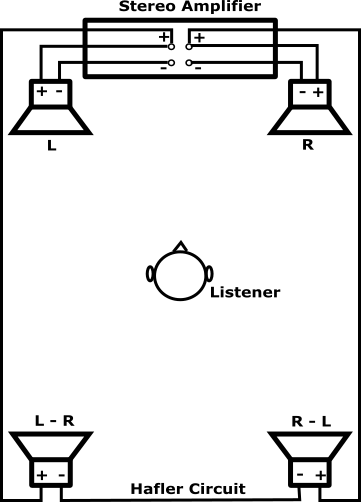
Diagram showing a Hafler circuit

The Hafler circuit is a passive electronics circuit with the aim of getting derived surround sound or ambiophony from regular stereo recordings without using costly electronics. Such circuits are generally known as matrix decoders. The Dynaquad system works using similar principles.

Named after its early proponent audio engineer David Hafler, the circuit exploits the high amount of stereo separation between Left and Right channels and sound phase. This type of system is called 2:2:4, since the rear channels are simulated from a two-channel stereo track, with no actual extra tracks encoded. The rear channels will playback out of phase sounds, while the forward channels are unaffected. Using the circuit typically reduces stereo separation by only about 2 dB and the rear speakers are only required to reproduce a limited frequency range (allowing them to be smaller and cheaper).

== Operation ==
The rear sound level in a live performance recorded in stereo is reproduced about 7 dB below the front level, but clearly audible. The rear ambient sounds, applause, and coughs from the audience are sometimes received out of phase by the stereo microphones, while sounds from the musicians mostly are in synchronous phase. Thus, if rear speakers are fed with the difference between the stereo channels, audience noises and reverberation from the auditorium may be heard from behind the listener. This can be most easily achieved by wiring two similar additional rear speakers in series between the live feeds (positive terminals) from the stereo amplifier. Alternatively, one rear speaker can be used on its own.

This is the type of quad setup used by Seeburg jukeboxes that had quadraphonic sound. The Hafler circuit is capable of partially decoding a Dolby Surround track since both share the same operating principles (based on sound phase differences). Yet the Hafler circuit lacks the proper separation or balance between channels of a true Dolby Pro Logic decoder.

Hafler decoding matrix	Left Front	Right Front	Left Back	Right Back
Left Total	1.0	0.0	1.0	-1.0
Right Total	0.0	1.0	-1.0	1.0

In the early and mid-1970s, for example, Ferguson made two-channel receivers with a built-in Hafler circuit. Philips had a similar circuit in their two-channel receivers. Many receivers from middle price brands had such circuits, but often without a volume control for the rear channels. More expensive brands seldom had Hafler or similar circuits, because they thought such circuits increased the distortion of the sound. Most of Marantz' four-channel receivers had a variable matrix called Vari-Matrix (not to be confused with Sansui's QS Vario Matrix) that could simulate four-channel stereo from two-channel sources in different ways and the listener could adapt the sound with a control. The Vari-Matrix could also, with good results, play all matrix records. Technics by National Panasonic had a similar matrix decoder with two controls. Tandy Corporation used this circuitry for Quatravox matrix decoders used in their Realistic branded Hi-Fi systems sold at their Radio Shack stores in the US.

In the early 1970s, the words "ambiophony" and "ambiophonic" were synonymous with the phrases "quadraphonic" and "four-channel stereo". But around 1973 the words ambiophony and ambiophonic were used to describe simulated four-channel stereo of the Hafler type. Ambiophonic could also mean the so-called concert hall sound in opposite to a surround sound with instruments all around the listener. The concert hall sound means the listener hears all the instruments from the front, whereas the rear channels are mainly used to give the listener the acoustic effect of sitting in a concert hall. (Ambiophony or ambiophonic sound should not be confused with Ambiophonics or Ambisonics.)

== See also ==
- Azimuth co-ordinator
- Dolby Pro Logic
- Dynaquad
- Four-channel compact disc digital audio
- Matrix decoder
- Multitrack recording
- Octophonic sound
- Quatravox

https://theafterword.co.uk/brian-enos-ambient-speaker-system/
