= Nikko TRM-800 =

Stereo audio amplifier

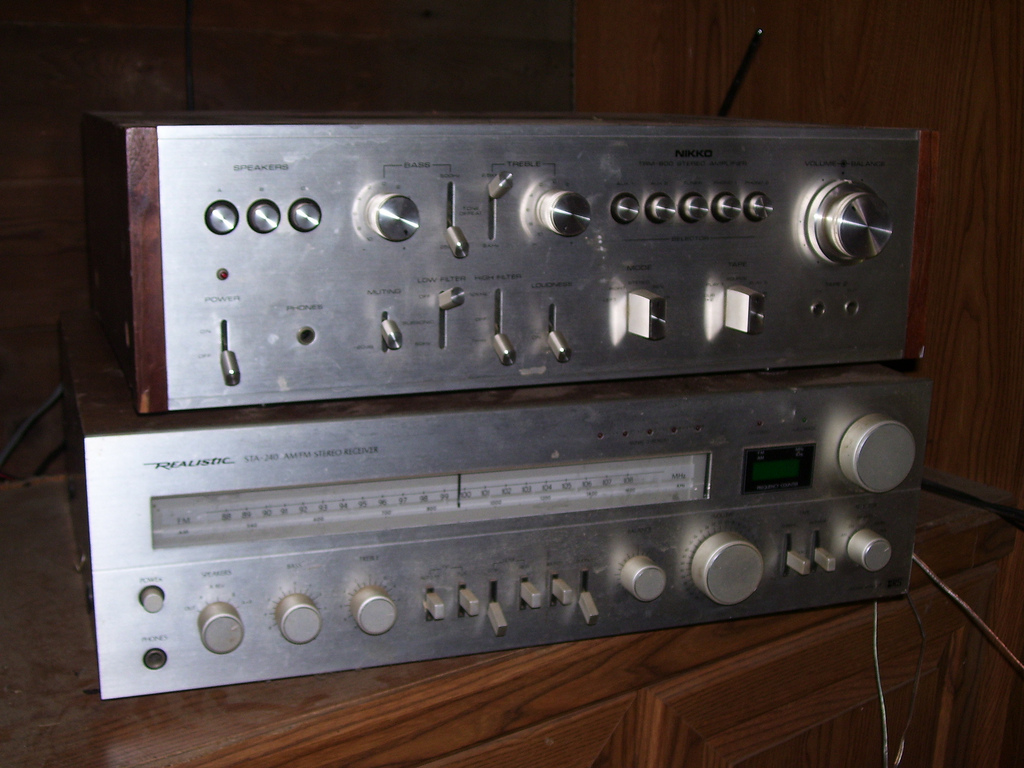
TRM-800 on a rare Realistic STA-240 receiver

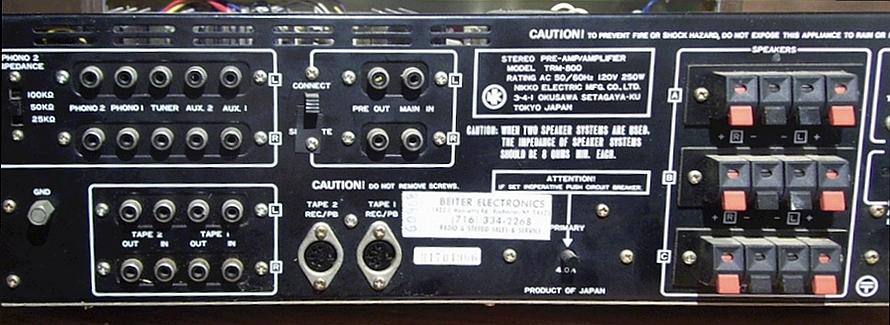
Back of unit showing connections

The TRM-800 was a high-end solid state integrated stereo amplifier made in Japan, using NEC power transistors, by Nikko. It was the top-of-the-line model in the Nikko amplifier range of TRM's series; housed in a wooden walnut-finished cabinet and a brushed aluminum front panel, was introduced in 1975 the same year as the Marantz 2235. It was a two-channel amp; however, it had three sets of speaker connections; those powered selected by buttons. At 8 ohms, the amp could put out 65 Watts per channel RMS (90 Watts per channel RMS at 4 ohms), delivering superb high fidelity sound with exceptional tone quality. Unlike many amps of this time, however, the TRM-800 was stable at lower impedances than 8 ohms; down to 4 ohms. The TRM-800's frequency response ranges 10Hz to 40.000 Hz ±1 dB with T.H.D. less than 0.1% at rated output. Its preamplifier and main amplifier were separable for multi-channel amplifier systems. The amp has internal circuit breakers which prevent it from clipping or overheating. Its power consumption is 250 watts (according to label). For equalization it has only a bass and a treble knob; however the frequency of these are selectable; between 250 and 500 Hertz for the bass, and between 2.5 and 5 kHz for the treble. It also has a high, low, and a subsonic filter. There are two phono stages; phono 2 is provided with impedance matching selection, for using different types of cartridges (MC/MM).

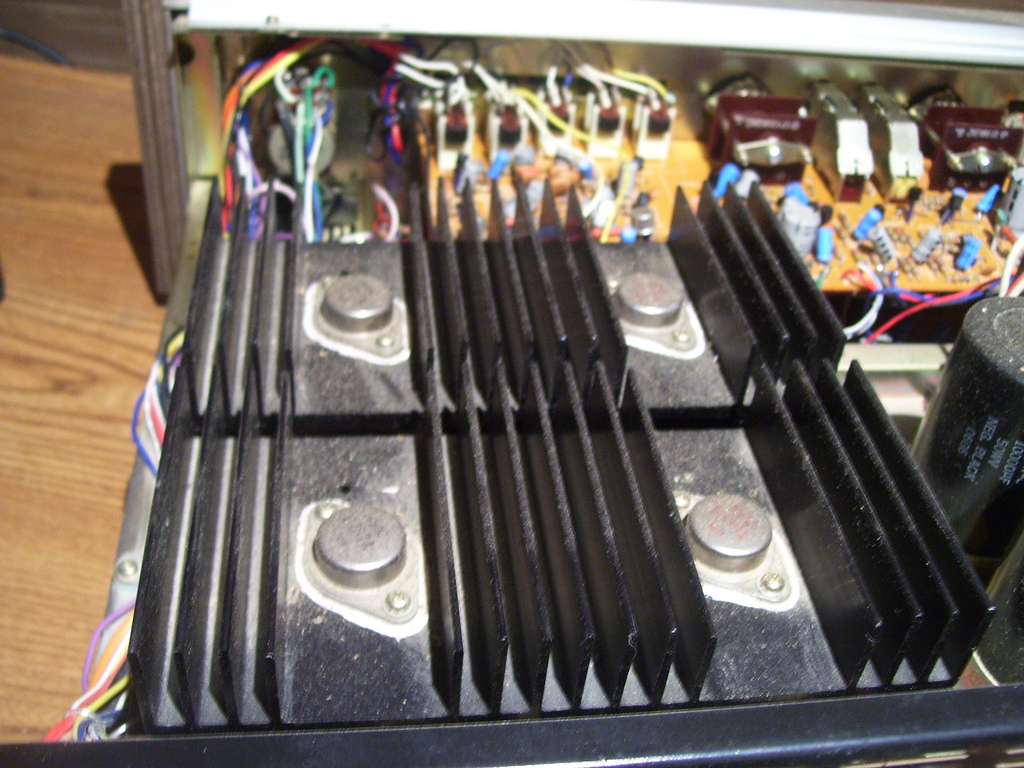
Large heatsinks and output transistors

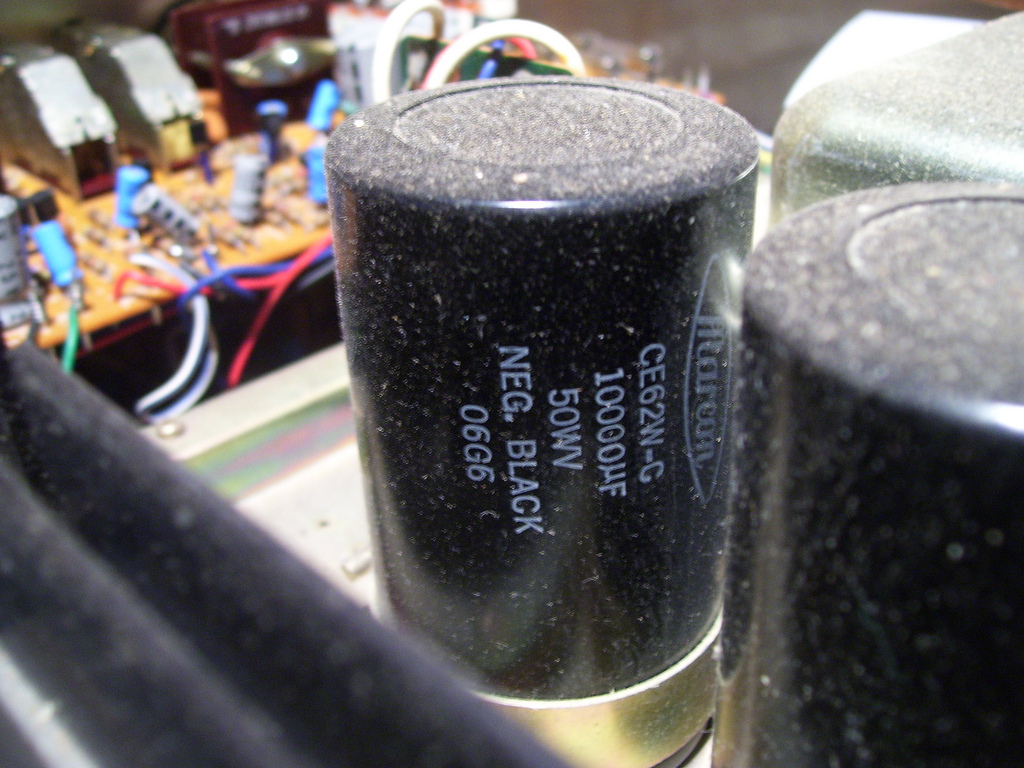
10,000 microfarads
