= Virginia Coigney =

American screenwriter

Virginia A. Coigney (October 2, 1917 – December 18, 1997) was an American civic leader, journalist and author. She married journalist and author Robert Travers in the mid-1930s and was the mother of folk singer Mary Travers of Peter, Paul and Mary fame.

== Biography ==
Coigney was born in Piggott, Arkansas, and raised near Albany, New York, where she quit school to become a reporter for the Albany Knickerbocker Press.

In later life Coigney was an author and radio/television scriptwriter. She wrote scripts for the soap operas Young Doctor Malone and The Edge of Night. She wrote a biography of Dr. Margaret Sanger, the birth-control advocate.

Coigney died in a Greenwich, Connecticut nursing home. She was survived by daughters, Mary Travers and Ann Gordon, as well as four grandchildren and two great-granddaughters.

One of the books written by Virginia Coigney in a "Do You Know" series of books is titled Who Did It? It was edited by Eve Merriam and illustrated by Murray Tinkelman. The first edition was printed in 1963 in the U.S. and published simultaneously by Collier-Macmillan Limited, London. Library of Congress Catalog Card Number: 63-12789. Other books in the series include Where Is It?, Who Said It? and What's in the Middle of a Riddle?.
