= Mary Travers =

American folk singer (1936–2009)

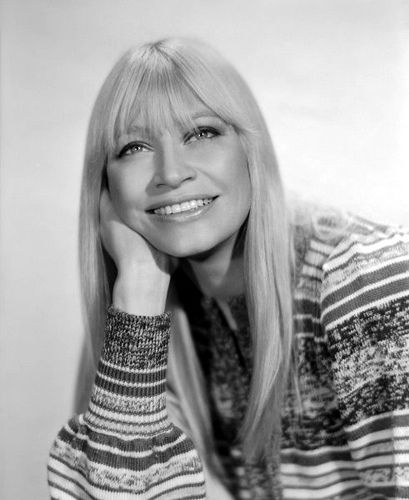
- Travers in 1977
- Born: Mary Allin Travers; November 9, 1936; Louisville, Kentucky, U.S.
- Died: September 16, 2009 (aged 72); Danbury, Connecticut, U.S.
- Resting place: Umpawaug Cemetery, Redding, Connecticut, U.S.
- Occupation: Singer
- Years active: 1955–2009
- Spouses: John Filler (m. 1958; div. 1960) Barry Feinstein (m. 1963; div. 1968) Gerald L. Taylor (m. 1969; div. 1975) Ethan Robbins (m. 1991)
- Children: 2
- Parent: Virginia Coigney (mother)
- Musical career
- Genres: Folk; pop
- Instrument: Vocals
- Labels: Warner Bros.; Chrysalis
- Website: peterpaulandmary.com

Mary Allin Travers (November 9, 1936 – September 16, 2009) was an American singer who found fame as a member of the 1960s folk trio Peter, Paul and Mary, along with Peter Yarrow and Paul Stookey. Travers grew up amid the burgeoning folk scene in New York City's Greenwich Village, and she released five solo albums. She was a contralto.

== Early life and education ==
Mary Travers was born in 1936 in Louisville, Kentucky, to Robert Travers and Virginia Coigney, journalists and active organizers of The Newspaper Guild, a trade union. In 1938, when Robert's employer, The Herald-Post, closed, the family moved to Greenwich Village in New York City.

Mary attended the progressive Little Red School House, where she met musical icons like Pete Seeger and Paul Robeson. Robeson sang her lullabies. Travers left school in the 11th grade to become a member of the Song Swappers folk group.

== Singing career ==
The Song Swappers sang backup for Pete Seeger on four reissue albums in 1955, when Folkways Records reissued a collection of Seeger's pro-union folk songs, Talking Union. Travers regarded her singing as a hobby (she worked full-time as a dental technician) and was shy about it, but was encouraged by fellow musicians. She also was in the cast of the Broadway show The Next President.

The group Peter, Paul and Mary was formed in 1961, and was an immediate success. They shared a manager, Albert Grossman, with Bob Dylan. Their success with Dylan's "Don't Think Twice, It's All Right" helped propel Dylan's Freewheelin' album into the U.S. Top 30 four months after its release.

Peter, Paul and Mary broke up in 1970, shortly after having their biggest UK hit, singer-songwriter John Denver's ballad "Leaving on a Jet Plane" (originally titled "Babe I Hate To Go") (UK No. 2, February 1970). The song, which reached the top of both the U.S. Billboard and Cash Box charts in December 1969, was the group's only number one hit.

Travers subsequently pursued a solo career and recorded five albums: Mary (1971), Morning Glory (1972), All My Choices (1973), Circles (1974) and It's in Everyone of Us (1978). The group reunited for one night in June 1972 to take part in a special fundraising concert at Madison Square Garden for presidential candidate Sen. George McGovern.

Peter, Paul and Mary re-formed in 1978, toured extensively, and issued many new albums until Travers' death. BBC television recorded their performance at the Southport Theatre in 1983. The group was inducted into the Vocal Group Hall of Fame in 1999.

== Personal life ==
Travers was married four times. Her first brief union, to John Filler, produced her elder daughter, Erika, in 1960. In 1963, she married Barry Feinstein, a prominent freelance photographer of musicians and celebrities. Her younger daughter, Alicia, was born in 1966, and the couple divorced the following year. In the 1970s, she was married to Gerald Taylor, publisher of National Lampoon. After the end of her marriage to Taylor, Travers had a relationship with lawyer Richard Ben-Veniste for several years while raising her daughters in New York. In 1991 she married restaurateur Ethan Robbins and lived with him in the small town of Redding, Connecticut for the remainder of her life.

== Illness and death ==
In 2004, Travers was diagnosed with leukemia. A bone marrow transplant in 2005 induced a temporary remission, but she died on September 16, 2009, at Danbury Hospital in Connecticut, from complications related to the marrow transplant and other treatments. She was interred in Umpawaug Cemetery in Redding.

== Legacy ==
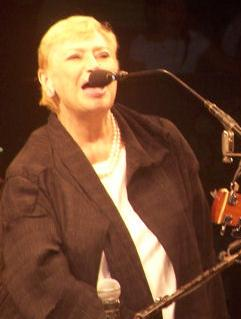
Travers in 2006

Travers's memorial service was held on November 9, 2009, at Riverside Church in New York City. The four-hour service, on what would have been her 73rd birthday, was attended by a capacity crowd. Remembrances by feminist Gloria Steinem and folk singer Theodore Bikel were two notable reflections of many shared at the service, speaking to the impact of Mary Travers' work and the significance of her legacy. Steinem commented that with her poise and conviction as a performer, Travers "seemed to us to be a free woman, and that helped us to be free." Bikel, co-founder of the Newport Folk Festival, mused on her roles as political activist and glamorous pop-music touchstone: “There were other people besides Mary who taught us that dissent was right and dissent was just,” he said. “But only Mary taught us that dissent was also beautiful.”

== Solo discography ==
- Mary, Warner Bros., 1971
- Morning Glory, Warner Bros., 1972
- All My Choices, Warner Bros., 1973
- Circles, Warner Bros., 1974
- It's in Everyone of Us, Chrysalis, 1978

== See also ==
- List of people from the Louisville metropolitan area
