= Mary (Mary Travers album) =

Studio album by Mary Travers
- Released: February 1971
- Recorded: 1970
- Genre: Folk
- Length: 36:20
- Label: Warner Bros. WS-1907
- Producer: Milton Okun

Mary Travers chronology
Mary (1971)	Morning Glory (1972)

Mary is the debut solo album by Mary Travers of Peter, Paul and Mary. It was the most successful of the five solo albums she recorded between 1971 and 1978.

The album was released on CD for the first time in 2008 as part of the "Solo Recordings" three-CD set released by Rhino Entertainment and sold exclusively at Barnes & Noble. The three-CD set contains the self-titled debut solo albums of all the three members of the group.

== Reception ==
Sounds gave the album a resoundingly positive review, praising the warmth and variety of Travers's vocals, applauding the choice of Lee Holdridge as the arranger and conductor, and saying that the songs "are all natural reflections of Mary's outlook on life, love and herself and are handled by everyone connected with the album with delicacy and feeling."

== Track listing ==
=== Side one ===
1. "The Song is Love" 3:00 (Paul Stookey, Peter Yarrow, Mary Travers, David Dixon, Richard Kniss)
2. "I Guess He'd Rather Be in Colorado" (2:06) (Bill Danoff, Taffy Nivert)
3. "Children One and All" (3:17) (Rod McKuen)
4. "The First Time Ever I Saw Your Face" (2:50) (Ewan MacColl)
5. "I Wish I Knew How It Would Feel to Be Free" (3:25) (Billy Taylor, Dick Dallas)
6. "Erika with The Windy Yellow Hair" (1:15) (Mary Travers, Lee Holdridge)
7. "Rhymes and Reasons" (2:37) (John Denver)

=== Side two ===
1. "Follow Me" (2:36) (John Denver)
2. "On the Path of Glory (La Colline Au Whisky)" (2:15) (Kris Ife, Guy Magenta, Petula Clark, Pierre Delanoë, Hal Shaper)
3. "Circus" (3:16) (John Denver, Michael Johnson, Laurie Kuehn)
4. "Song for the Asking" (2:03) (Paul Simon)
5. "Indian Sunset" (6:59) (Elton John, Bernie Taupin)

== Personnel ==
- Mary Travers – vocals
- John Denver – guitar
- Sal DiTroia – guitar
- Paul Griffin – piano
- Frank Owens – piano
- Margaret Ross – harp

Technical

- Milton Okun – producer
- Lee Holdridge – arranger, conductor
- Phil Ramone – associate producer and recording engineer
- Milton Glaser – design
- Carl Fischer – photography

== Charts ==
Album - Billboard (United States)

Year	Chart	Position
1971	Pop Albums	71

Album - RPM (Canada)

Year	Chart	Position
1971	Top Albums	66
