= Electro-Voice RE20 =

Professional broadcasting and music microphone

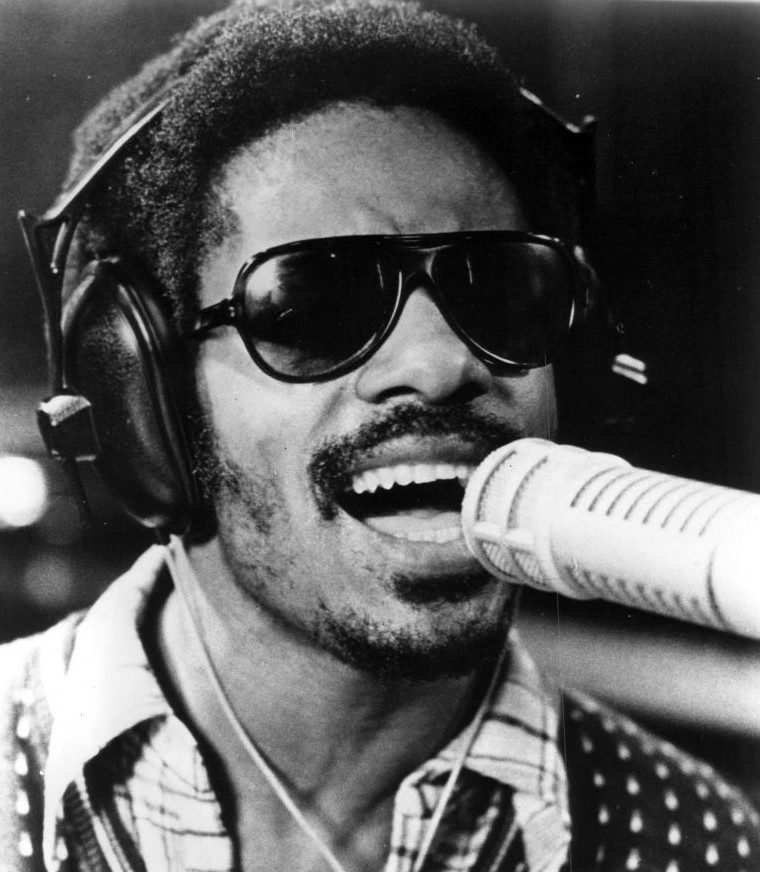
Stevie Wonder singing into an RE20 in 1973

The Electro-Voice RE20 is an American professional cardioid dynamic microphone, commonly used in broadcasting applications since 1968. Designed by Electro-Voice using the company's patented Variable-D technology and a large-diaphragm element, it has been described as an industry standard "iconic" microphone for its natural sound and its wide usage in radio, television and recording studios. In 2015, the RE20 was inducted into the TEC Awards Technology Hall of Fame.

The RE20 was modified in the late 1980s with neodymium magnet structure, resulting in the RE27N/D model. Both models are still in production. A blue-gray version was produced in the 1990s: the PL20. Two black-colored models are also available, with the RE320 having a switch to select a curve for voice and a setting tailored for miking a kick drum.

== Development: Variable-D ==
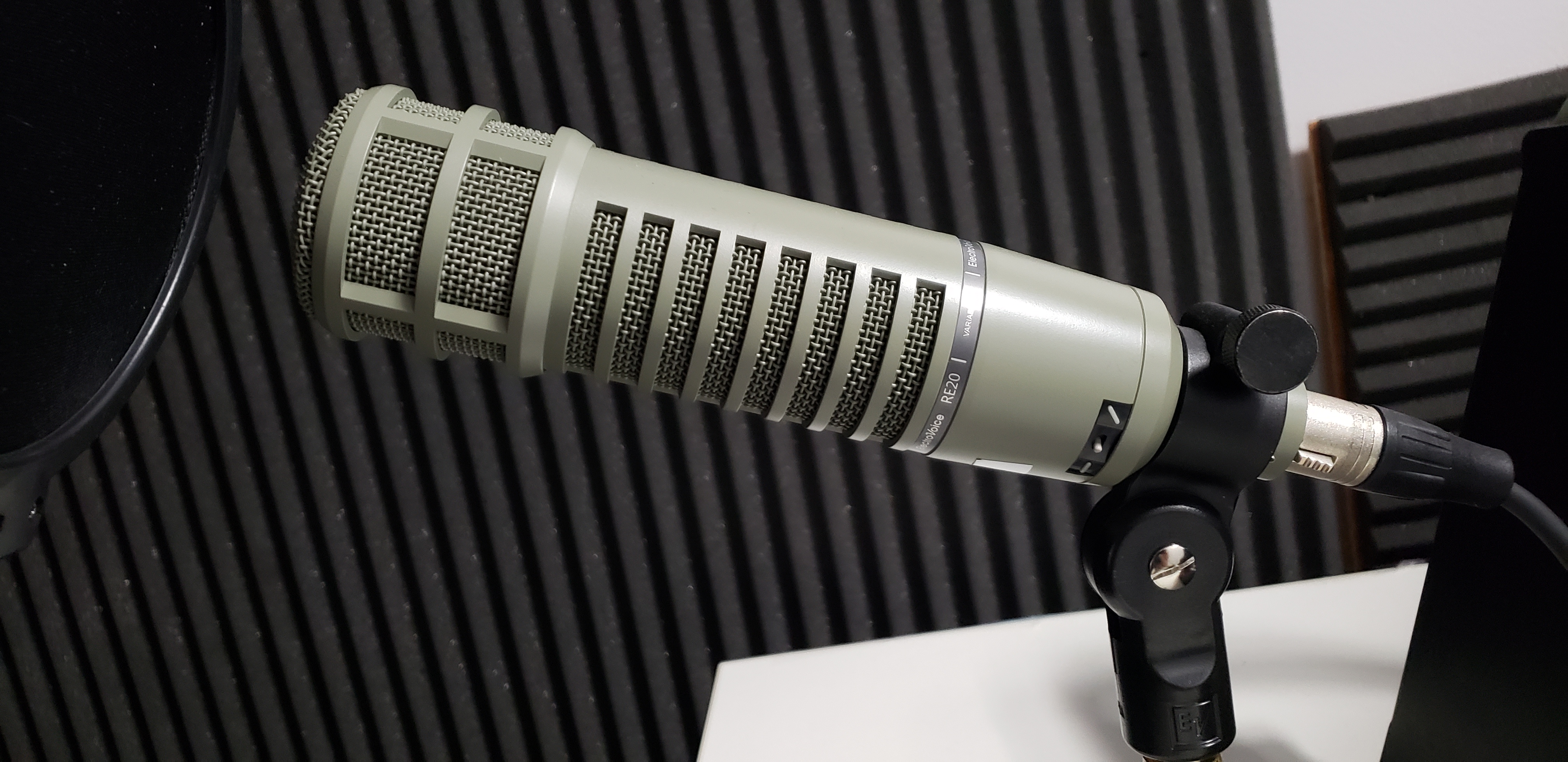
RE20 in an isolation booth for recording voice-overs

In 1953, Electro-Voice (EV) developed the Variable-D technology to reshape the microphone pickup area into a cardioid directional pattern, using only one transducer element. A major improvement was the elimination of problems with the proximity effect, achieved by directing sound waves to the rear of the transducer element through multiple ports in the housing. The polished aluminum model 664 microphone was the first Variable-D product, followed by the cheaper, lower quality 665, and the high quality olive drab–painted 666, the latter becoming popular with television studios and broadcasters. The 666 was relatively heavy, with a prominent ridge in the housing containing the ports and ducting, so in the 1960s EV replaced it with the RE15, a lightweight, slender microphone with a row of ports in the handle representing EV's new "Continuously Variable-D" design. The RE15 was widely adopted for television studios, for example on The Lawrence Welk Show.

EV wanted to create a dynamic microphone that could compete with the high fidelity of condenser microphones, and they assigned the task to engineer Tom Lininger. In 1968, Lininger produced the RE20, incorporating the Variable-D concept. The RE20 was big, more than twice as heavy as the 666, but the fidelity was excellent. The microphone came with a switch to tailor the mid-bass response, attenuating frequencies below 400 Hz with a mild high-pass filter. Like all premium microphones made by EV, it used EV's 1930s humbucker method of reducing electromagnetic interference by wiring a humbucking coil out of polarity with the microphone element coil. The microphone's element was positioned relatively far from the grille to keep announcers from getting too loud. An internal polyurethane pop filter helped reduce breathy plosives.

In 1986, EV began releasing microphones with rare earth neodymium magnets in the transducer assembly. The RE20 concept was given this new configuration, resulting in the RE27N/D model. The RE27N/D also came with extra tone-shaping filters: a 200 Hz sharp low-cut filter, 1,000 Hz gentle bass rolloff, and treble roll off. The PL Series was introduced by EV in 1990 to attract the recording studio market, including a dark blue-gray version of the RE20 with the designation PL20; this model is discontinued. In 2011, the black RE320 model was rolled out to address the popular usage on bass drum (kick drum), complete with a switch to tailor the frequency response. A black RE20 model was revealed in 2020.

== Broadcast ==
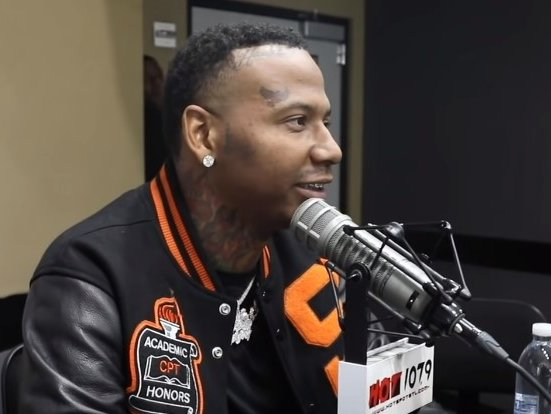
WHTA radio station microphone in front of rapper Moneybagg Yo in 2020. The RE20 is held in the 309A shock mount.

The broadcasting field used a variety of microphones including the German Sennheiser MD 421 (1960) and the American SM5 (1966) by Shure. When the RE20 was released in 1968, it was adopted by radio and television announcers for its natural sound and consistent level throughout the pickup pattern. The announcer could turn their head left and right without much change to the sound. One complaint was that the RE20 was less suited to soft-spoken people, but the added sensitivity of the RE27N/D solved that problem in the late 1980s.

The large size and weight of the RE20 requires a strong microphone stand or boom arm, and a very sturdy microphone clip or robust hanging yoke. The supplied mic clip (model number 320) is tightened securely with a knurled knob. An optional shock-mount is available for the RE20 family of microphones: the EV model 309A. The 309A is based on a steel yoke with rubber suspension cords surrounding a metal cage to hold the microphone. This mount greatly reduces vibrations carried through the microphone stand or boom arm.

The RE20 was seen on television for the ten-year run of the fictional sit-com Frasier, starting in 1993. Title character Frasier Crane (Kelsey Grammer) appeared to speak into the microphone to deliver psychiatry advice on talk radio. Other users of the RE20 family of microphones include film director Robert Altman. When he was depicting the making of A Prairie Home Companion radio show, Altman's 2006 fictionalized film featured eight RE27N/D microphones used by the singers and announcers, serving as their actual microphones, not just dummy props.

== Music ==
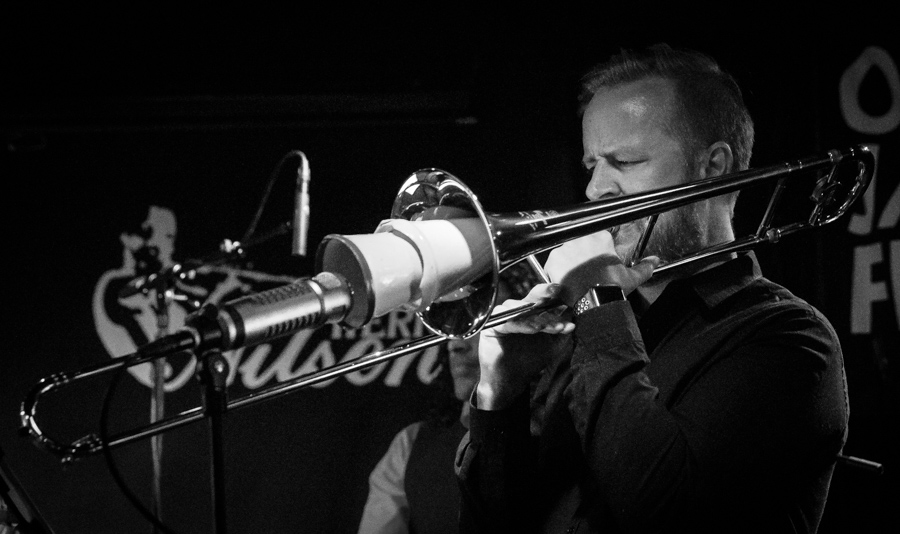
Norwegian jazz musician Even Kruse Skatrud plays muted trombone into an RE27N/D

The RE20 and its variations have been used for many purposes in music. On stage, the directional pattern helps prevent acoustic feedback, and the low-frequency fidelity makes the RE20 ideal for bass instruments such as kick drum, floor tom, bass guitar, larger saxophones and horns. The RE20 has also been used for electric guitar amps. The unmoving lower speaker in a Leslie cabinet may be picked up with an RE20; "Sweet Home Alabama" was recorded using this method.

Producer Robert Margouleff specified the RE20 for Stevie Wonder's vocals through two album projects: Talking Book in 1972 and Innervisions in 1973. Margouleff said that the RE20 helped achieve a "close, intimate sound". The distance from the grille to the element allowed Wonder to stay in contact with the microphone while singing, without overdriving the element.

Joan Jett's "I Love Rock 'n' Roll" was miked up in 1981 by engineer Glen Kolotkin using an RE20 for her vocals and another for guitar amps. He removed the front head from the kick drum, placed a pillow inside, then aimed an RE20 at the inside of the drum shell. For Carlos Santana's 1999 Supernatural album, Kolotkin placed RE20s on the electric guitar cabinets, along with other microphones to be mixed in combination. He used an RE20 by itself for kick drum. Kolotkin said the RE20 is "great for rock & roll."

In a 2010 vocal microphone shootout hosted by Sound on Sound magazine, the RE20 was judged the best for male rapper vocals, and it scored highly on other vocal types. Recording magazine agreed, noting that male voices benefited the most from the RE20. The large size and heavy mass of the RE20 prevent it from being used very often for live vocal performances on stage, but in the recording studio its size is not a problem.

== Podcast ==
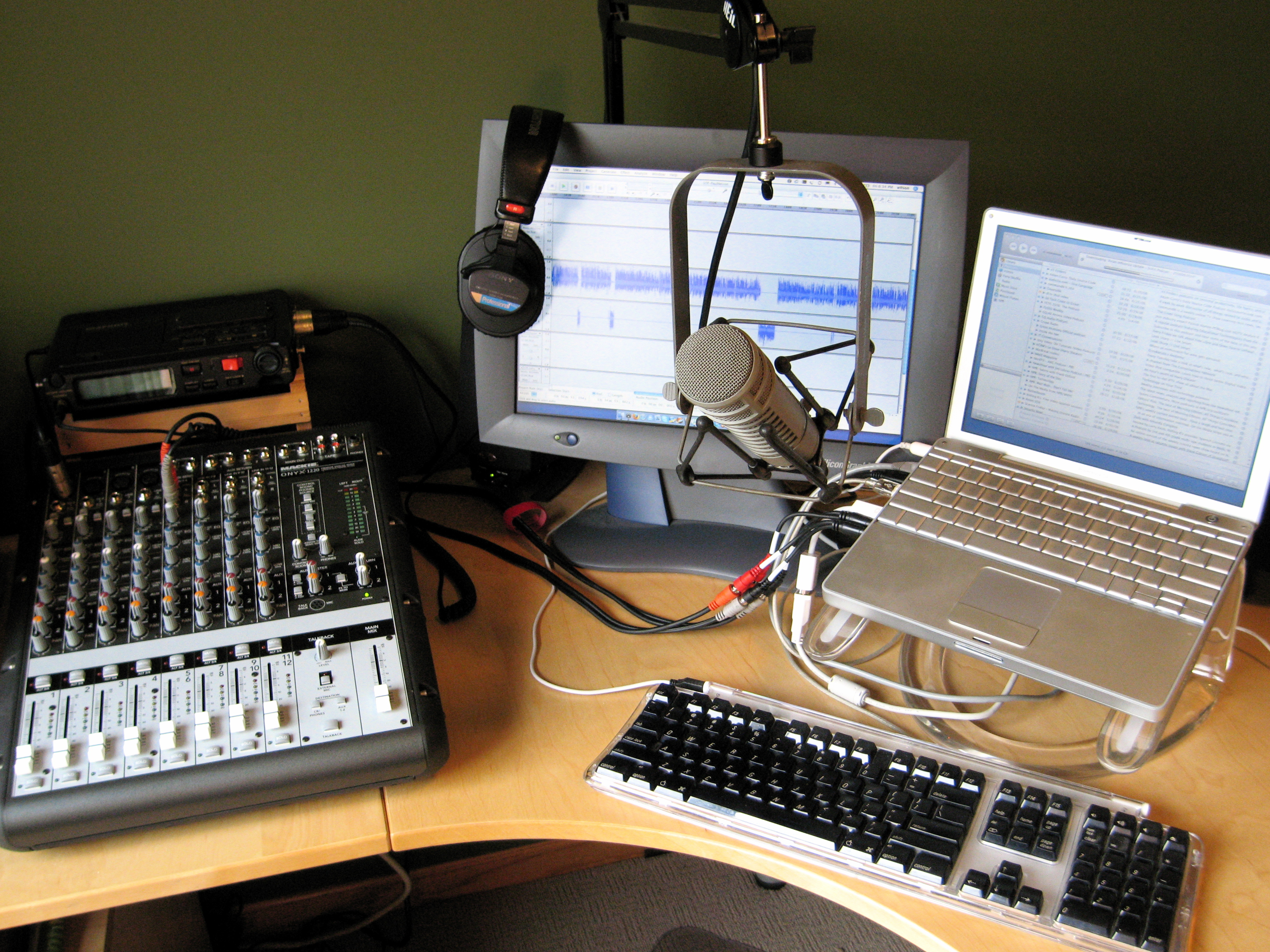
Voice-over recording and podcasting setup centered on the RE20 microphone

The RE20 has been used by many voice-over artists, some working from home studios. Its lower sensitivity requires higher gain from the mic preamp, or an inline gain booster. Podcasting became popular around 2005, often recording at home. The early podcasters used broadcast microphones of proven designs, such as the Shure SM7B and the RE20 family. The EV RE320 began to grow in popularity because of its lower price. Its pickup pattern focuses on the person speaking but also allows a small amount of room ambience. In a podcasting shootout in 2011, the RE20 scored first place among listeners surveyed.

== Specifications: RE20 ==
Type: Dynamic (moving coil)

Frequency response
45 to 18,000 Hz
Polar pattern
Cardioid
Sensitivity (at 1,000 Hz Open Circuit Voltage)
1.5 mV/Pascal
Impedance
150 ohms
Polarity
Positive pressure on diaphragm produces positive voltage on pin 2 relative to pin 3
Connector
Three-pin male XLR
Switches
Mid-bass reduction tone-shaping filter
Net weight
737 grams (26.0 oz)

== Versions ==
- RE20 – Steel body with dull matte finish. Tone-shaping switch attenuates low frequencies below 400 Hz with a mild 6 dB per octave slope.
- RE27N/D – Shiny "satin" metallic finish on steel. Neodymium element design adds 6 dB more sensitivity, with an open-circuit voltage of 2.5 mV/Pascal. Three switches for tone-shaping: 200 Hz sharp low-cut filter, 1,000 Hz gentle bass rolloff, and treble roll off.
- PL20 – Same as RE20 but with navy blue finish. Discontinued.
- RE320 – Black finish on steel, introduced in 2011. Same element as RE27N/D. One tone-shaping switch intended for kick drum applications, reducing 300 Hz by 4 dB with a half-octave-wide band-stop filter, while boosting mid-high frequencies for "presence", using a two-octave-wide band-pass filter centered at 4,000 Hz.
- RE20-Black – Same as RE20 but with low-reflection dark finish in charcoal gray. Introduced in 2020.
