= Realistic (brand) =

Former RadioShack brand

Realistic Electronics
- Industry: Electronics
- Founded: 1954; 2016 (revival)
- Defunct: 1999; 2017 (revival)
- Fate: Renamed Radio Shack brands
- Products: Record players, Audio receivers, Cassette decks, Ham radios, Speakers, Headphones

Realistic was a private label consumer electronics brand produced by RadioShack. Initially only a home audio equipment brand, its product line expanded to include CB radios, walkie-talkies, and video camcorders by the 1980s. The brand was discontinued in 1994, but revived for a short time in 2016 for use on Bluetooth devices sold by the chain.

== History ==
The brand began in 1954 after Radio Shack management were approached by stereo newcomer Harman Kardon, who offered to help create a line of private label audio equipment for the company. The original brand name, Realist, was pitched by the manufacturer and approved by Radio Shack. The first Realist-branded products - an FM receiver, an AM receiver, and a matching 10-watt amplifier with a built-in preamp - were introduced later that year. These would be the only Realist-branded products, as the brand’s name was challenged by the David White Company, manufacturer of the Stereo Realist camera in 1955. The change to Realistic that year was reportedly made just in time before Radio Shack’s 1956 catalogs were to be printed. The company's most notable products under the Realistic brand included the extensive line of TRC series Citizens Band radio transceivers, which dominated the CB Radio market during the 1970s, and included the Navaho series of CB base station units. A 1977 motion picture entitled Handle with Care was sponsored at the time by Tandy Corporation, in part to showcase the line. Also notable were their 8-track tape recorders under the TR- model line and their compact cassette decks under the SCT- model line. They are also the company responsible for the Realistic Mach speaker line. A very wide range of products was marketed under the Realistic brand. These included record players, stereo receivers, cassette decks, ham radios, musical synthesizers and a few quadraphonic receivers and shortwave radios.

=== Optimus ===
In 1993, Tandy Corporation sold off the bulk of its manufacturing facilities in a bid to not only cut costs but offer more brand-name electronics in lieu of their own. The Realistic name carried on into 1994 as the rest of the Tandy-produced stock was slowly being sold off. In that year, all outsourced audio equipment formerly bearing the Realistic name would carry the Radio Shack name, and the video equipment was renamed to Optimus, another private label audio equipment brand sold by the company since 1967. In May 1999 it was announced that the Optimus brand would be retired, after RadioShack entered an agreement with RCA to market their products.

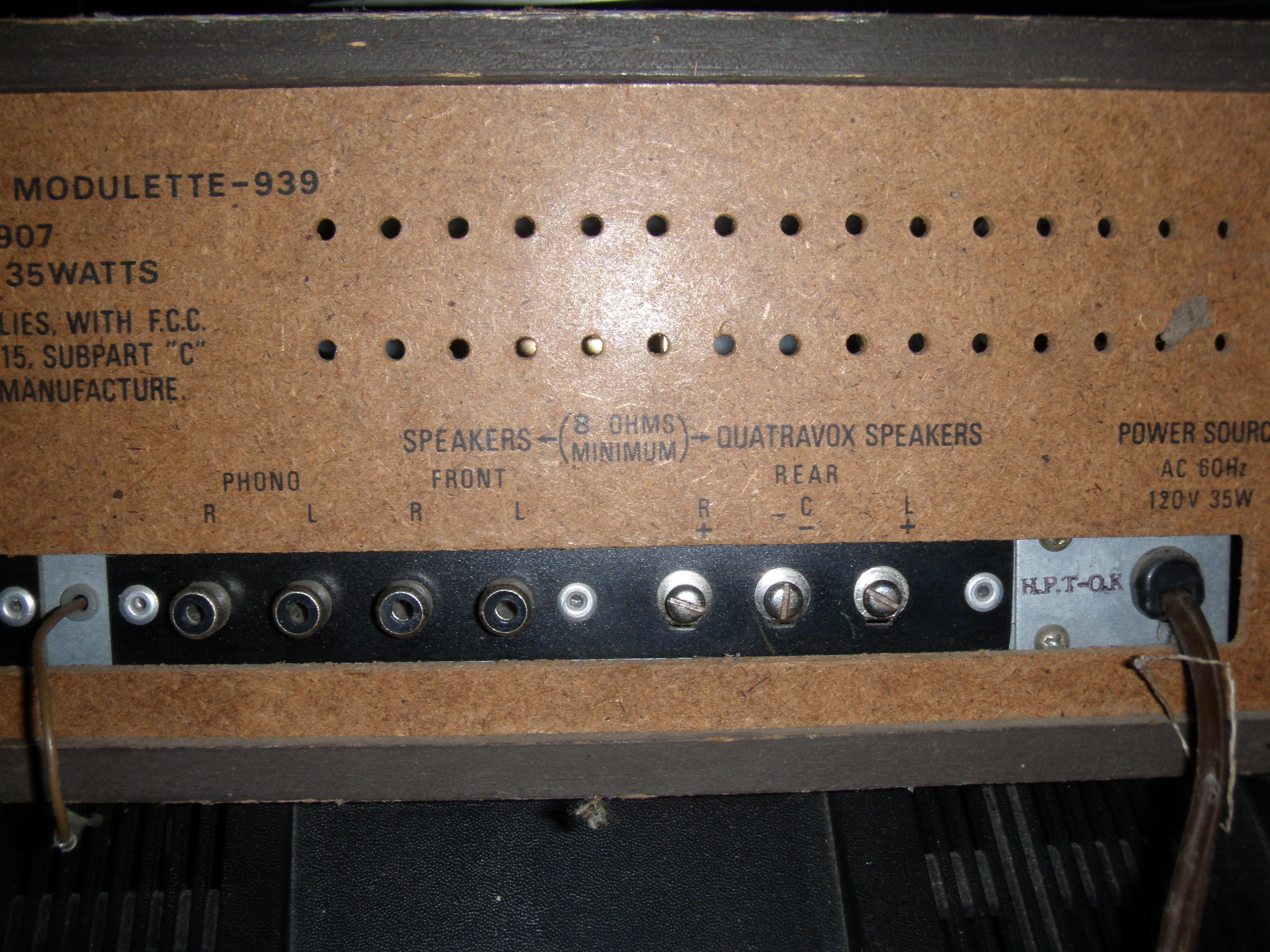
Rear of a Realistic Hi-Fi system with Quatravox output

Realistic enjoyed a short-lived return to RadioShack's stores in 2016, with a line of wireless Bluetooth speakers and wireless noise-canceling Bluetooth headphones.

=== Quatravox ===
Quatravox was the name of Realistic's synthesized four-channel output version of quadraphonic sound, which used Hafler circuitry to reproduce ambient sounds recorded by the microphones 180° out-of-phase with the intended recording (sounds recorded from opposite the microphone from the performers, i.e., studio echo, audience noise, etc.) and play them back through the rear loudspeakers out-of-phase with the main loudspeakers. The effect is a greater degree of separation than stereo sound, as the listener is able to hear echoes, applause, and other ambient sounds from behind (as opposed to in-front and thus out-of-phase with the main speakers and inaudible), even with stereo recordings. However, this degree of separation is not as great or as flexible as that of truly discrete quadraphonic sound.

== Models ==
The Realistic DX-60 is a multiband radio. The radio receives 3 MHz to 27 MHz AM shortwave in three bands, 26.965 MHz through 27.405 MHz HF CB in one band, 540 kHz to 1620 kHz standard AM broadcast in one band, and 87 MHz to 108 MHz monaural standard broadcast FM. The DX-60 existed in two versions, model 12-764 and a nearly identical but production-cost-reduced 12-764A.

The Realistic Patrolman SW-60 and the Realistic CB-60 are similar in overall appearance but cover different sets of bands.

The Realistic DX-150 and DX-160 series of Shortwave (LW/MW/SW) radios were affordable communications receivers, aimed largely at beginners, that also received SSB and CW via a BFO.

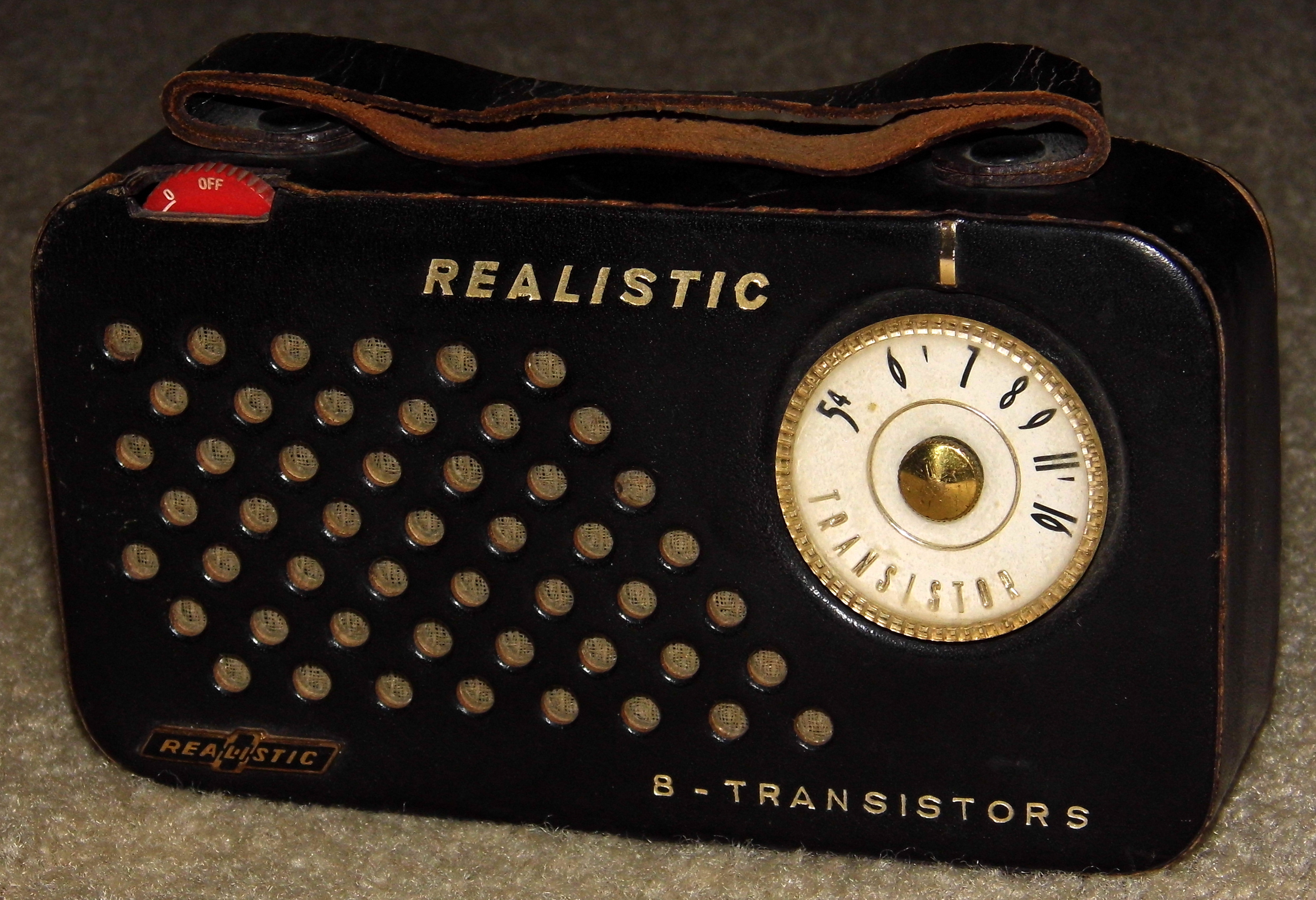
Realistic 8 Transistor Radio, Circa 1959

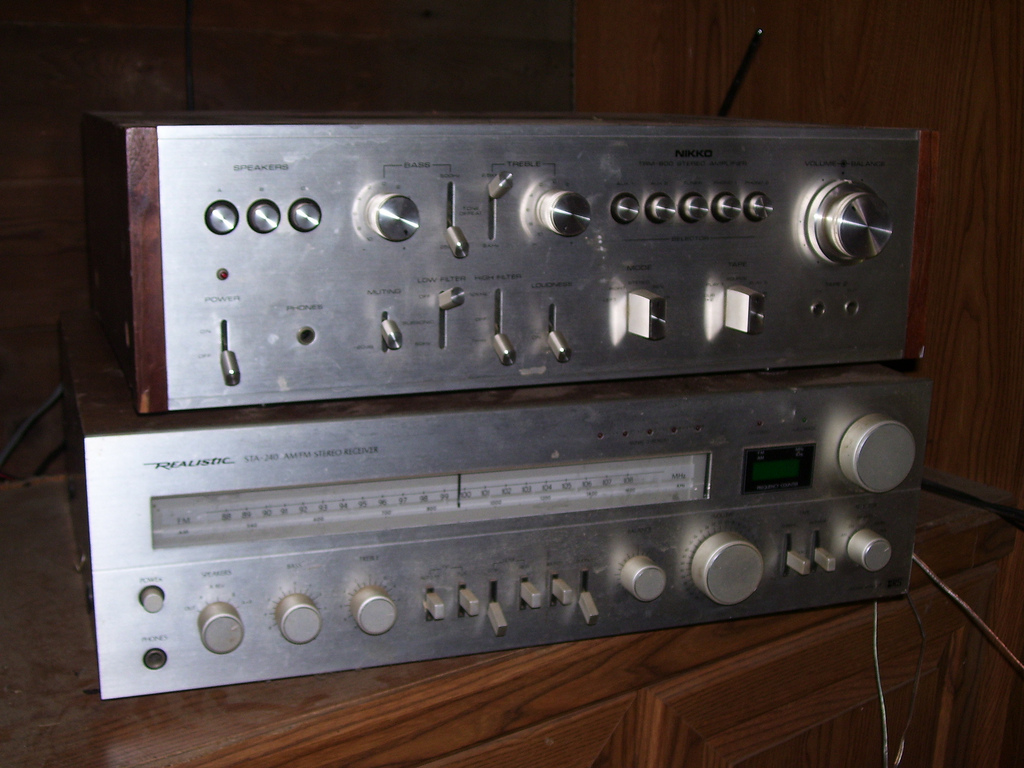
Realistic STA-240 receiver with a Nikko TRM-800 amplifier

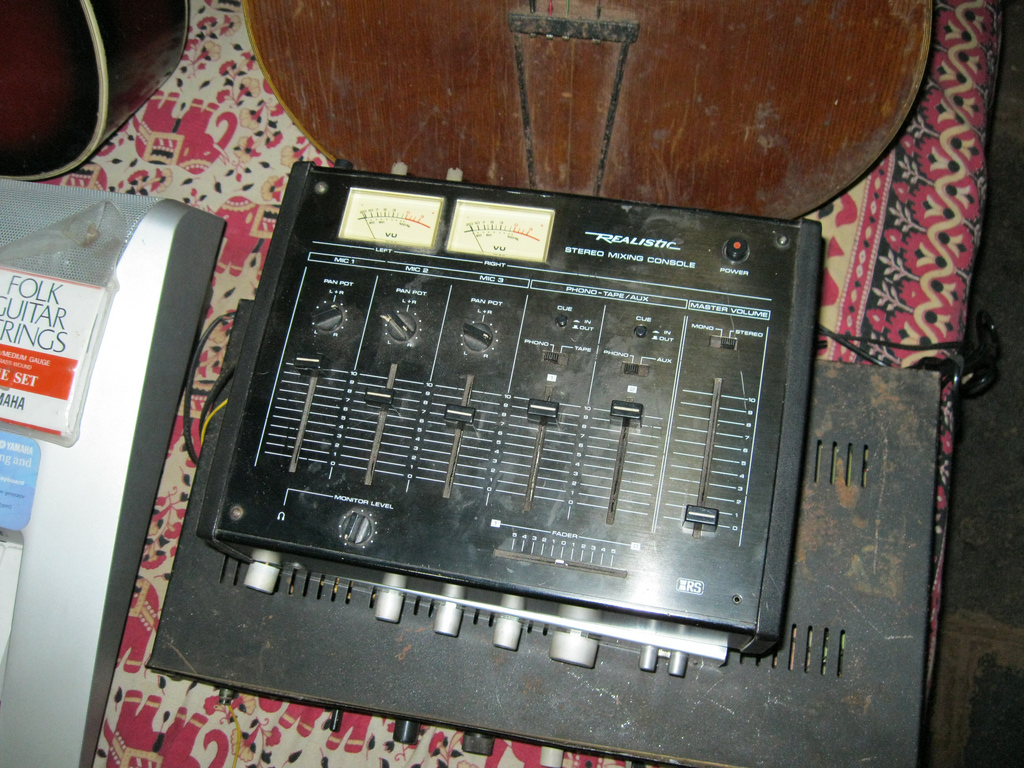
Realistic stereo mixing console

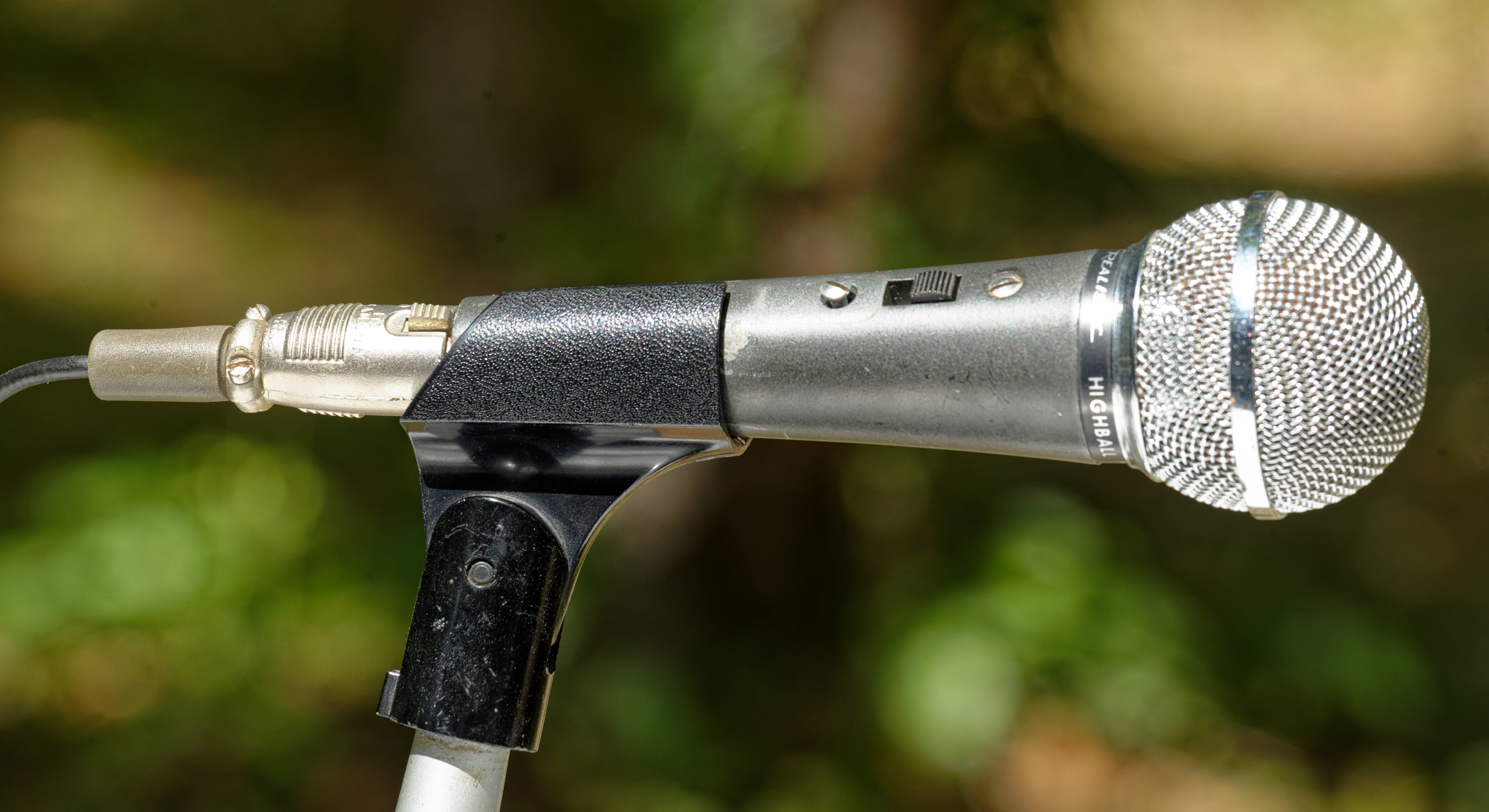
Shure 588SD microphone, branded as Realistic Highball, circa 1970

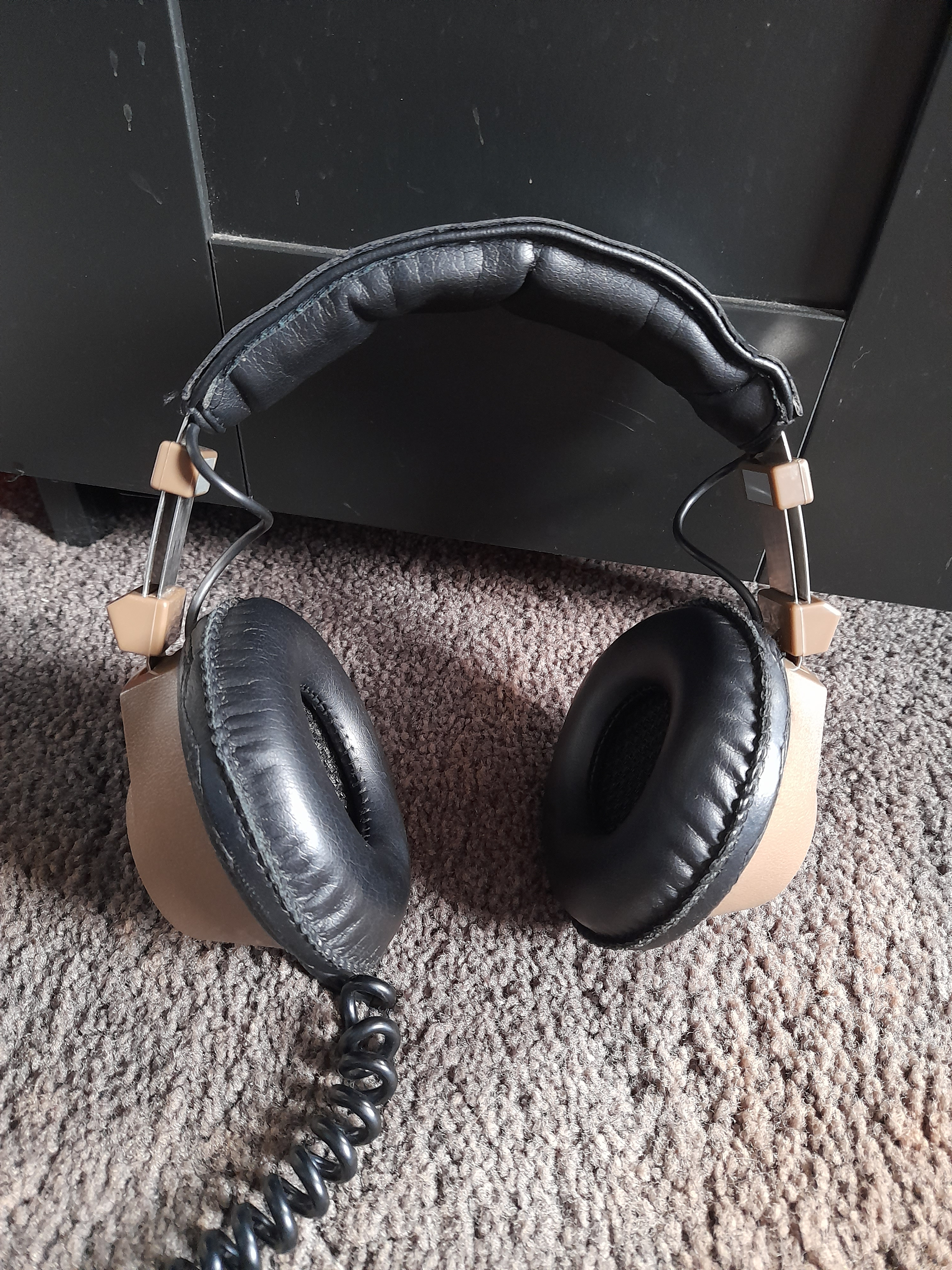
Realistic Nova 40 Headphones.

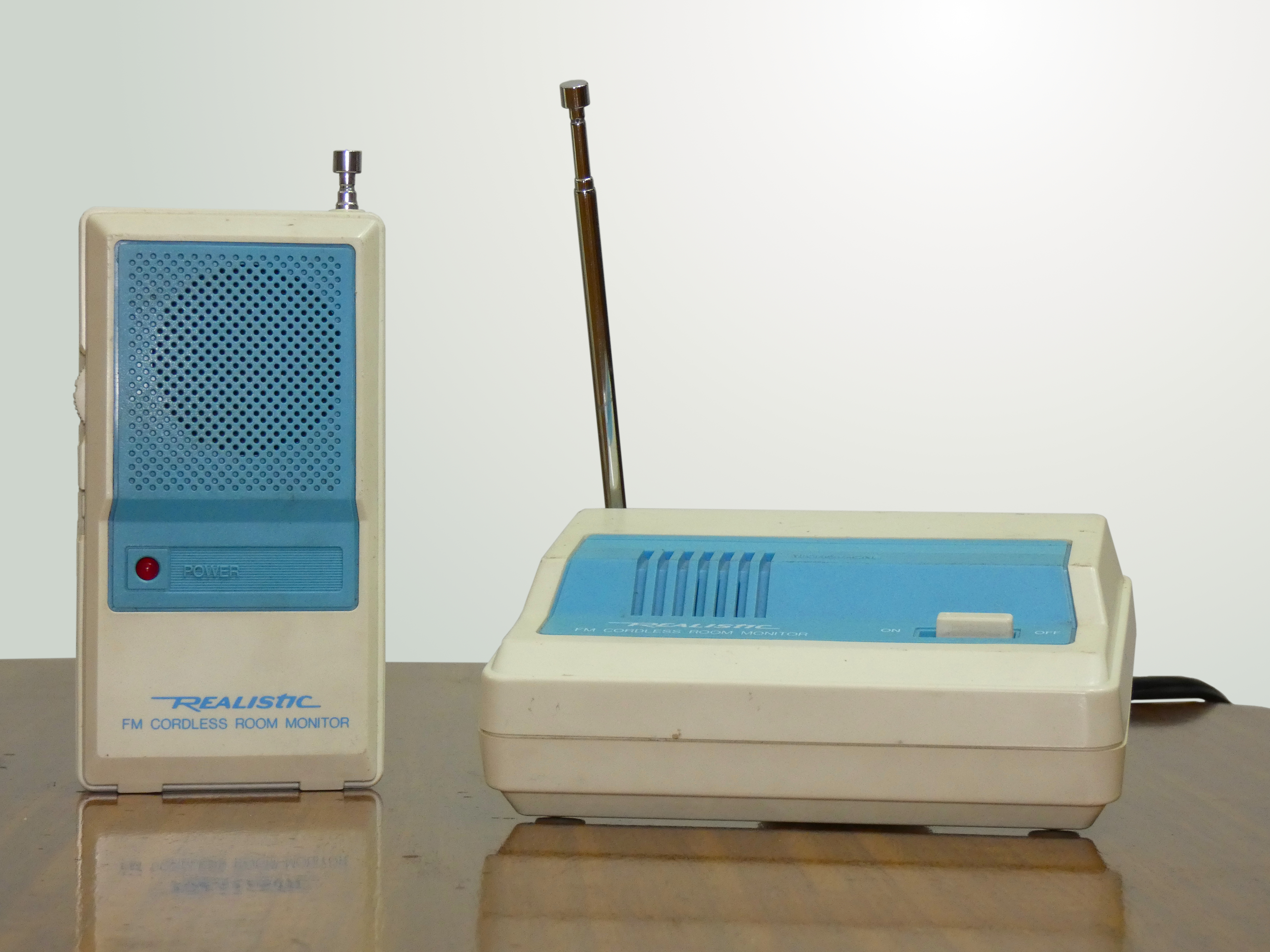
Realistic FM cordless room monitor.

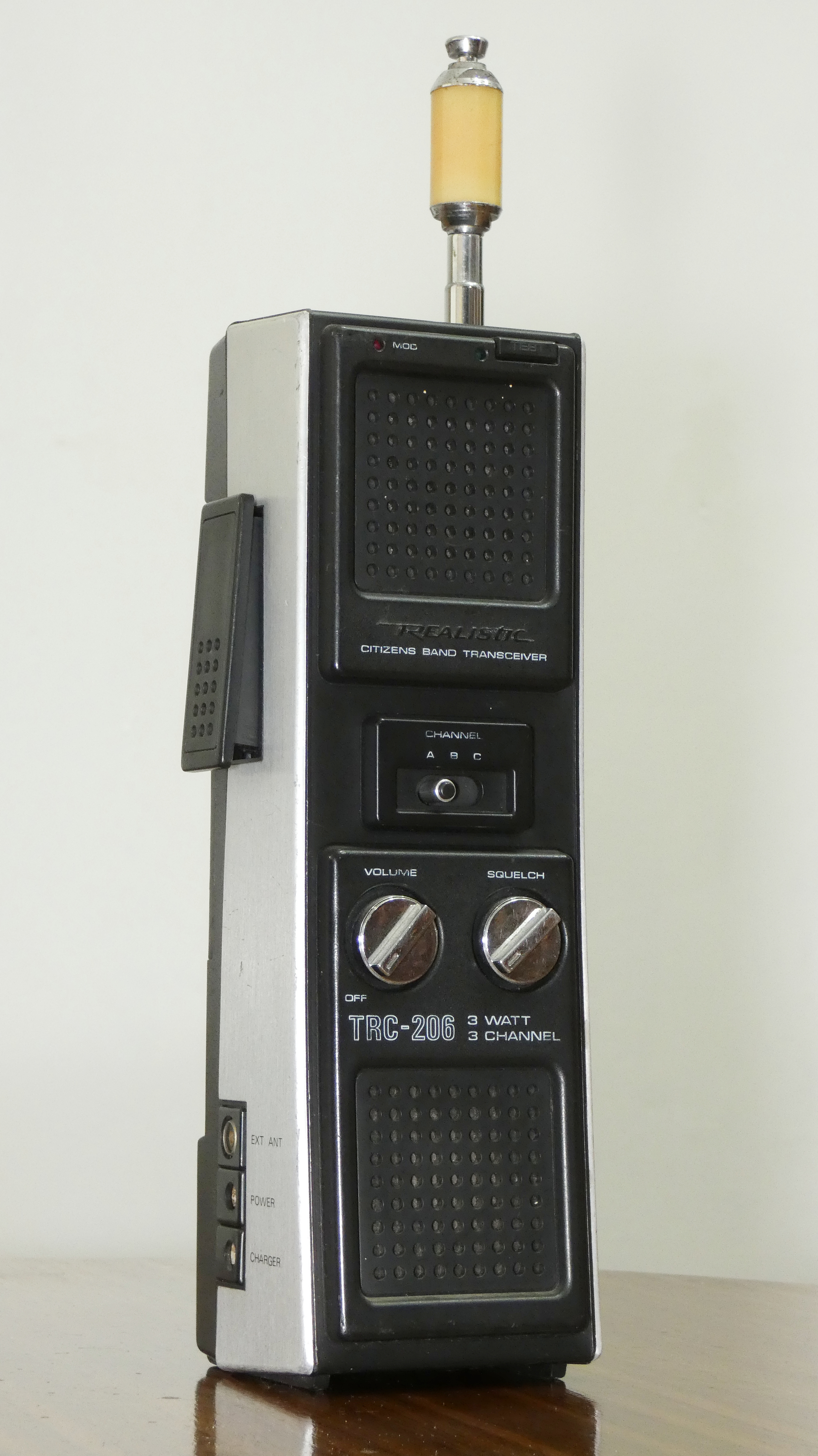
Realistic TRC-206 CB, 3 channels.

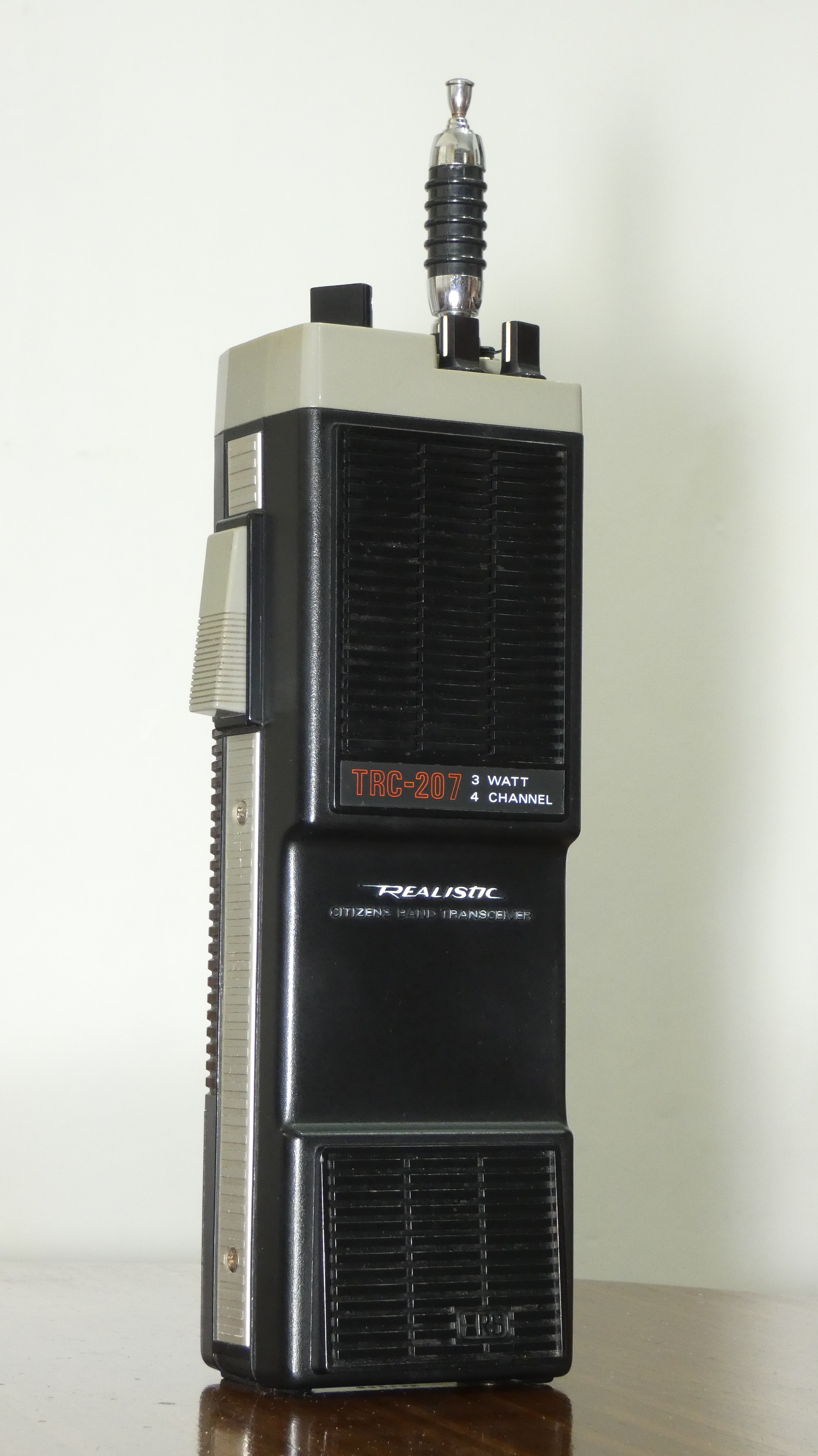
Realistic TRC-207 CB, 4 channels.

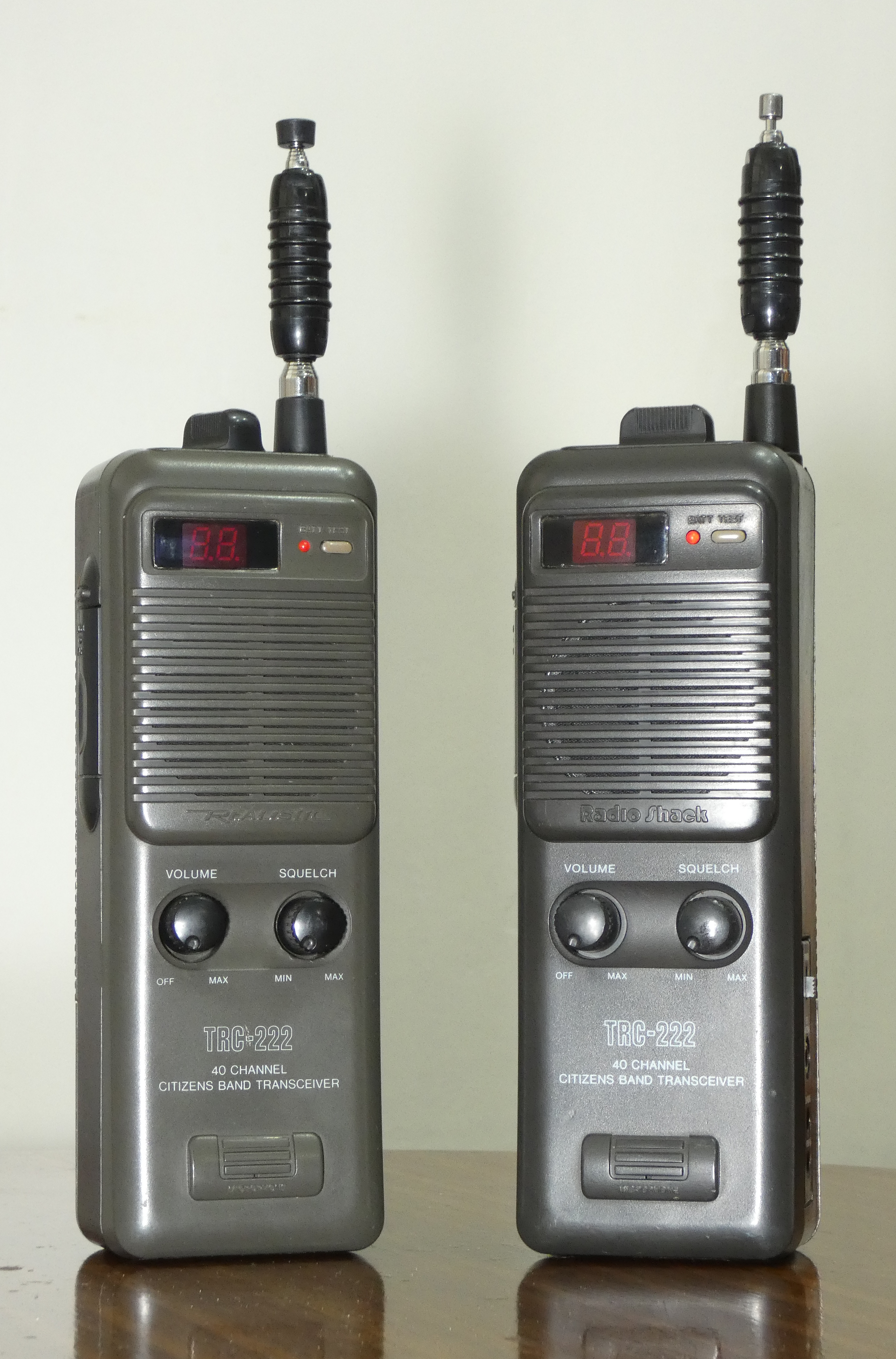
(From left to right) Realistic and RadioShack model TRC-222, circa 1993

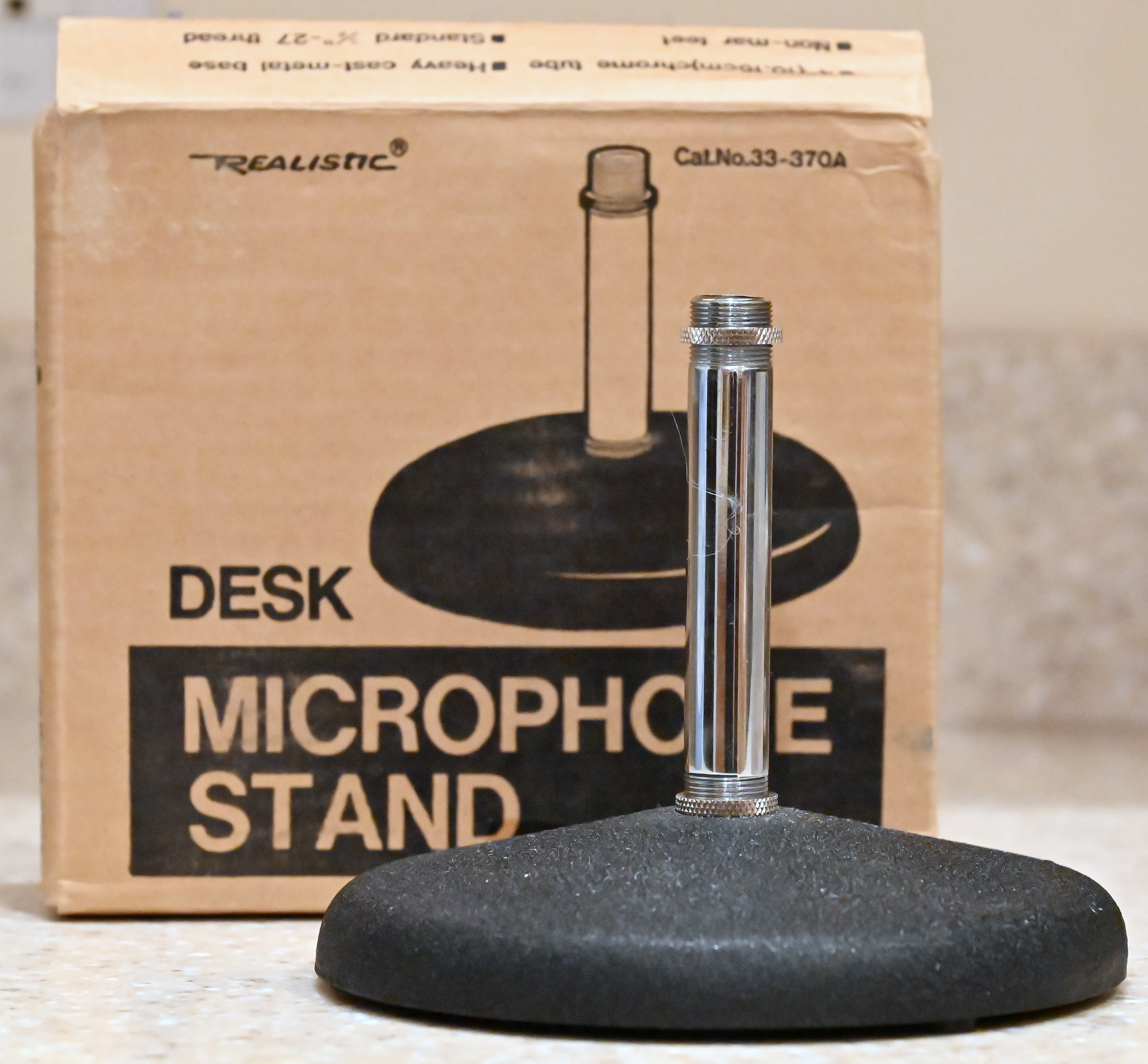
Desk microphone stand with box

Open-reel tape box

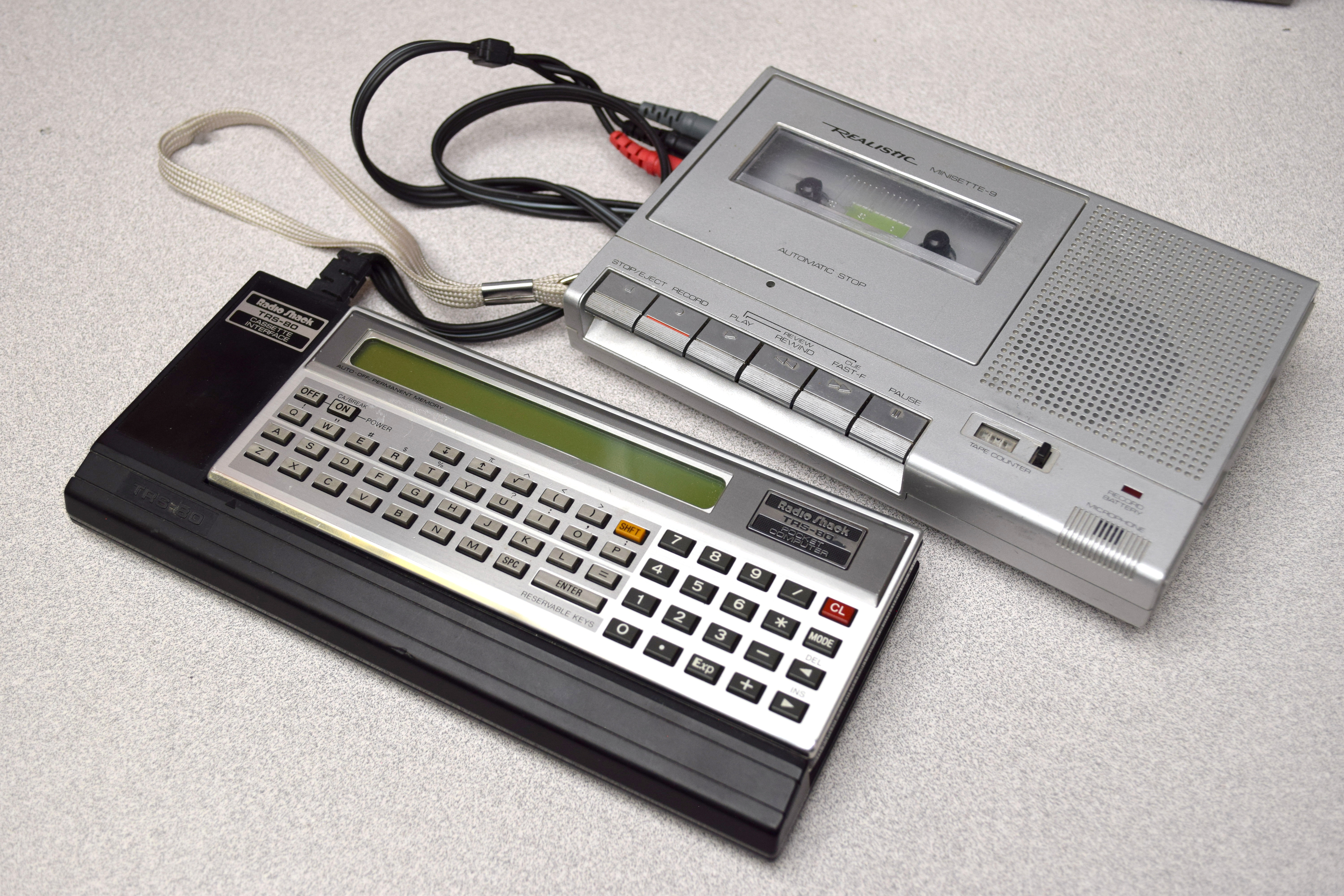
TRS-80 Pocket Computer PC-1 with Realistic Minisette 9

== In popular culture ==
- In the 1983 James Bond movie Never Say Never Again, the Sprectre agent Kovacs uses a Realistic DX-300 radio to contact Maximilian Largo from the spy trawler radio room.
- In the 1991 Steven Seagal movie Out for Justice, the mafioso Richie Madano (portrayed by William Forsythe) requests a getaway vehicle and instructs his associate's crew to wire a Realistic Patrolman PRO-2025 scanner into the car so he can evade Detective Gino Felino (Steven Seagal) and the rest of the police force.
