= Electro-Voice =

American audio equipment manufacturer

- Founded: 1930; 96 years ago
- Founders: Lou Burroughs, Albert R. Kahn
- Headquarters: Burnsville, Minnesota, United States
- Products: Pro audio, microphones, speakers, sound equipment
- Owner: Telex Communications
- Website: electrovoice.com

Electro-Voice (EV) is an American manufacturer of audio equipment, including microphones, amplifiers, and loudspeakers, focused on pro audio applications such as sound reinforcement and commercial and residential audiovisual installations. As a subdivision of Bosch Communications Systems Inc. since 2006, Electro-Voice markets products for use by consumers as well as small or large concert venues, broadcasting, houses of worship, and in retail situations.

== History ==
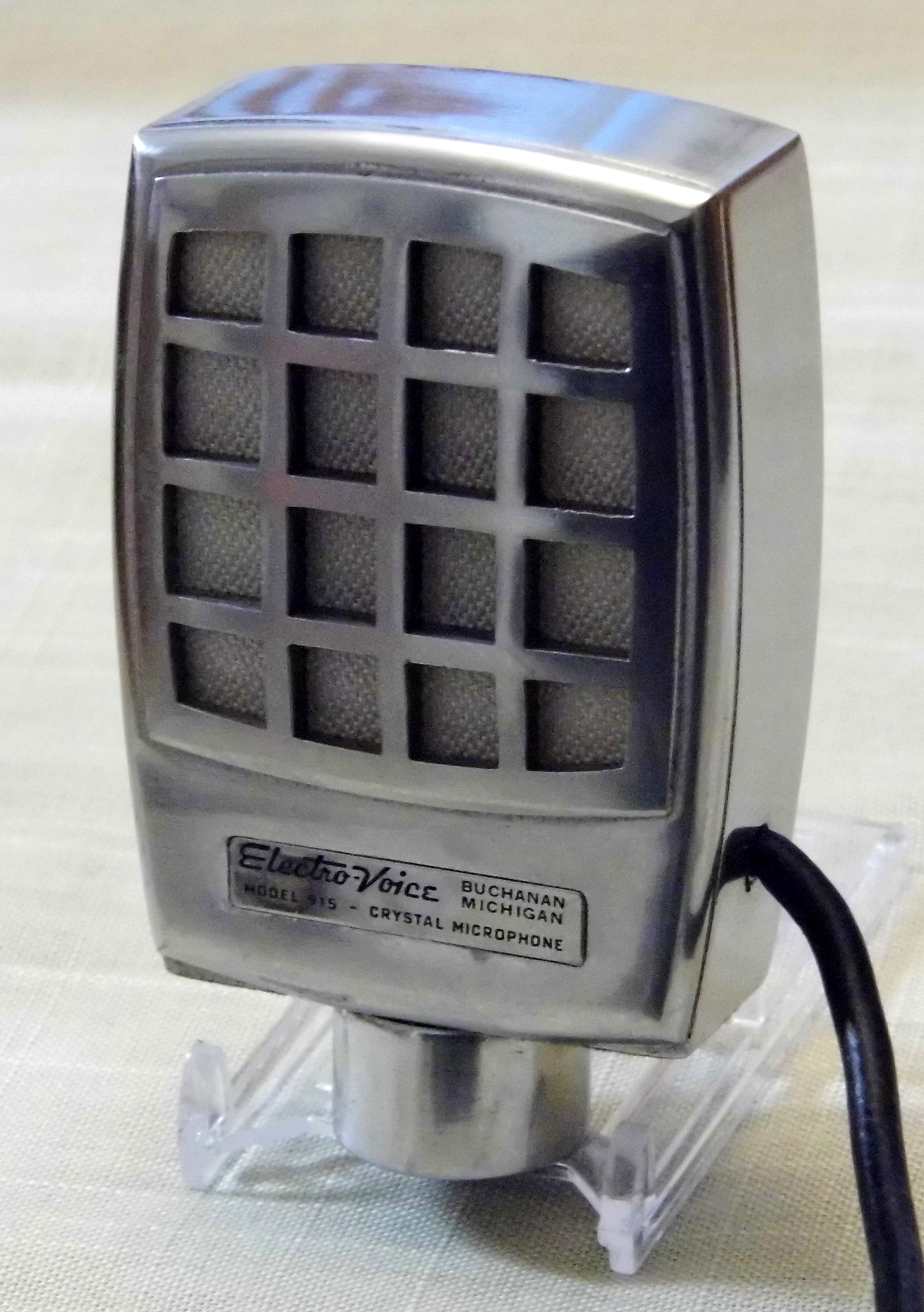
Electro-Voice "Century" crystal microphone, model 915

On September 1, 1927, Lou Burroughs and Albert R. Kahn began a small business called Radio Engineers, servicing radio receivers in the basement of the Century Tire and Rubber Company in South Bend, Indiana. Because of the Great Depression, according to Kahn, "We found ourselves insolvent to the extent of $5,000" ($96,365 today). They decided to focus their business on audio products. The company designed a PA system for Notre Dame football coach Knute Rockne. Rockne, who had difficulty being heard at football practices due to health problems that affected his voice, called the new PA system his "electric voice". Rockne's remark inspired the company's name. On June 1, 1930, Burroughs and Kahn incorporated under the name "Electro-Voice".

The partners recognized an opportunity to capitalize on what they perceived as the generally poor quality and high prices of existing microphones. They purchased a lathe and a drill and started producing about one microphone a week. Soon after, Burroughs withdrew from the business, leaving complete ownership to Kahn. By 1933, the previous business debts were completely paid off, and Electro-Voice began hiring manufacturing employees. In 1936, twenty people were hired, and Lou Burroughs returned as chief engineer.

During World War II, EV developed the noise-canceling microphone. Noise cancelling microphones such as the Electro-Voice T45 lip microphone were instrumental to fighter and bomber airplane, tank, battleship and ground troop radio communications. EV licensed the patent to the government for free to be applied by other manufacturers to produce what was needed for the war supply.

In 1946, the business moved to a bigger facility in Buchanan, Michigan and expanded its engineering efforts. In 1948, they began successfully producing phonograph pickup cartridges. In 1950, they started production of the first automatic TV booster. They also started to design and produce a consumer loudspeaker line in response to increased public interest in high-fidelity music listening. In 1952, EV patented the Compound Diffraction Horn, which changed the look and performance the traditional cone-shaped paging horn. Known for its high output, the CDP was deployed by the Navy on aircraft carriers and other high noise environments.

In the mid-1950s, EV introduced the 664 dynamic microphone. It became known as "The Buchanan Hammer" when chief engineer Lou Burroughs demonstrated its durability during sales presentations by hammering nails into a board with it before using it for his public address. Buchanan referred to the company's Michigan headquarters.

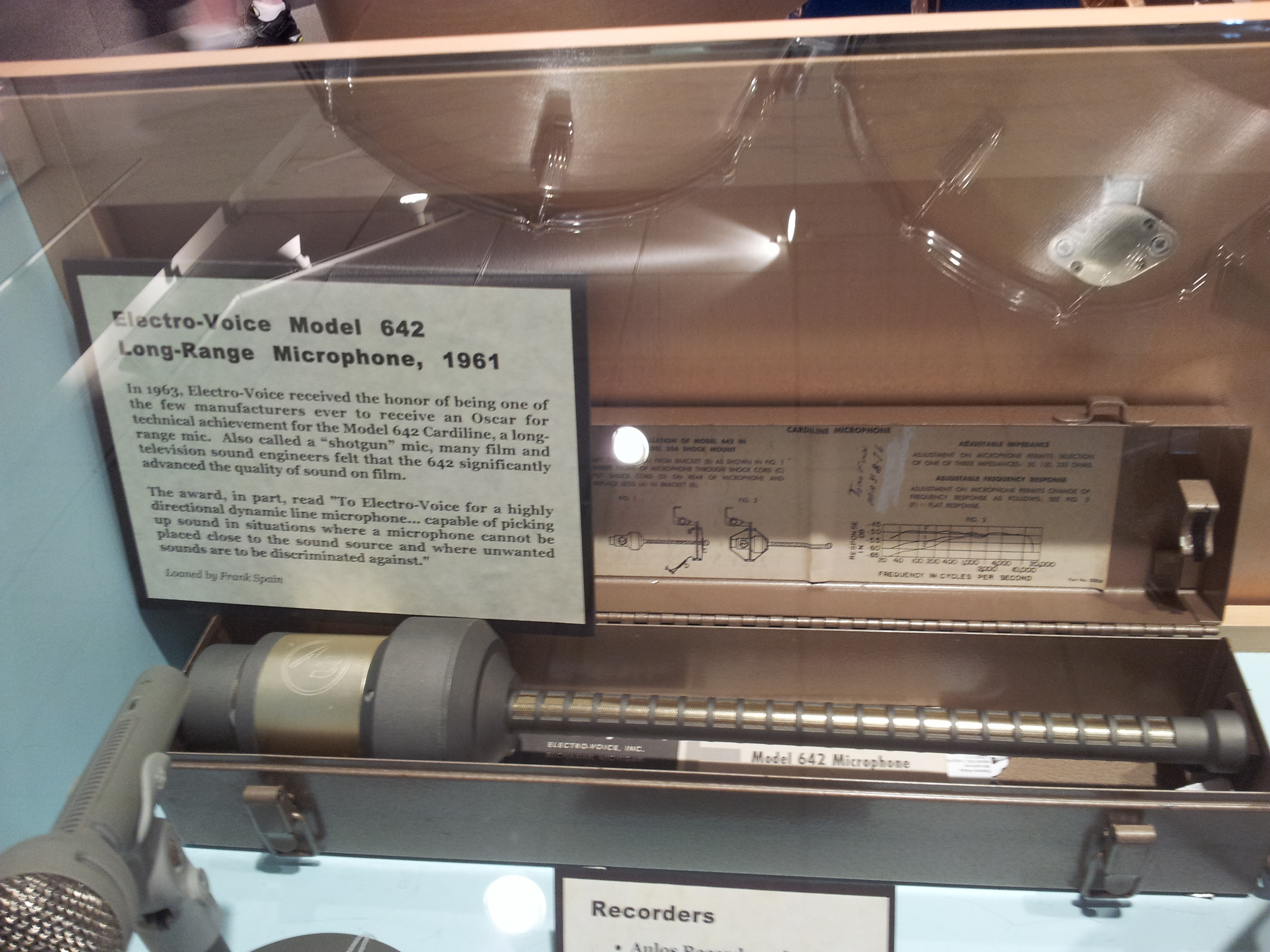
Electro-Voice received a 1963 Academy Award for their 642 Cardiline shotgun microphone.

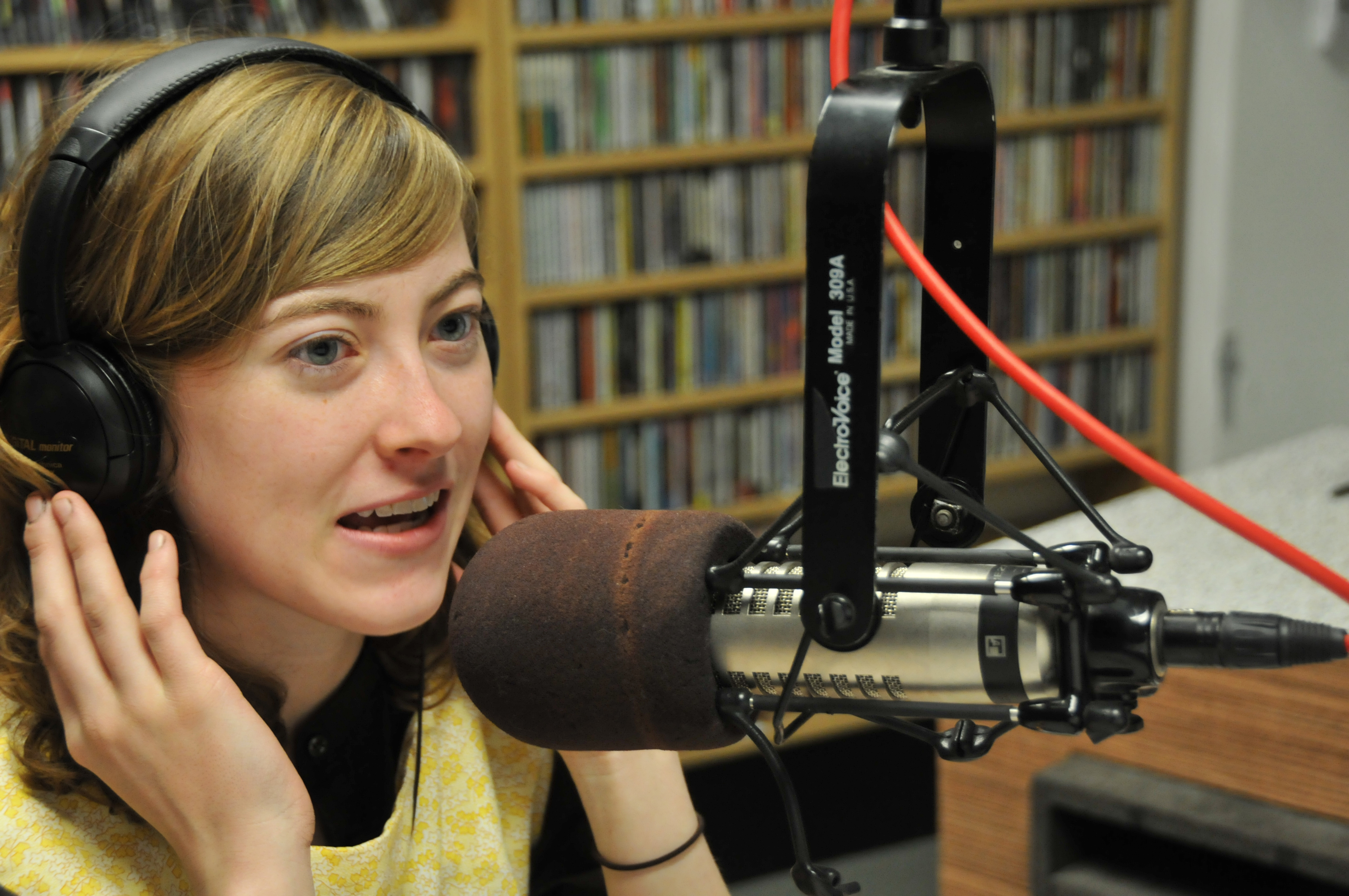
Electro-Voice RE-27N/D microphone

In 1963, EV received an Academy Award for their 642 Cardiline shotgun microphone, the first ever given for an audio product.

Electro-Voice launched its RE Series of microphones in the 1960s, notably the RE15, which was used extensively by musicians on television shows. The RE series used "Variable D" technology first developed by EV in 1953, which eliminated changes in tone and frequency response corresponding to changes in the physical distance of the sound source from the microphone. The RE20 broadcast microphone was introduced in 1968, followed by the RE27N/D in the late 1980s, using neodymium magnets. Both continue to be used in recording studios and on the concert stage.

1978 US patent sketch of Electro-Voice constant-directivity horn

In the early 1970s, EV developed the first commercial system for matrix four channel stereo called Stereo-4. When Columbia/CBS and Sony developed their Stereo Quadraphonic system (SQ) that system became the leading matrix system. Electro-Voice then adapted their decoders so they also could play SQ records as well as Sansui's QS records. The EV system could also simulate four channel sound from two channel sources.

In 1978, Electro-Voice patented its Constant Directivity Horn, which produced an even balance of frequencies across the listening field. It overcame the uneven dispersion of high frequencies that affected the typical high frequency horns used in many professional sound speakers until the late seventies.

Also in the 1970s, EV acquired TAPCO. The company, founded by Greg Mackie, specialized in audio mixers. TAPCO products soon became prominent in the EV product line.

In the late 1980s, EV became the first microphone manufacturer to use neodymium magnets in its microphones. The N/DYM microphones were introduced in the mid-1980s to combine the high output and high frequency response characteristics of condenser microphones with the rugged shock resistance of dynamic microphones. Around the same time EV's first wireless microphones were being produced.

== Mergers ==
The company merged with Telex Communications in 1998. Prior to the merger, EV was owned by Mark IV Industries, Inc. through its subsidiary, Gulton Industries, Inc., and had manufacturing plants in Buchanan, Michigan; Newport, Tennessee; Sevierville, Tennessee; and Gananoque, Ontario. Electro-Voice's headquarters were in Buchanan, Michigan until the merger with Telex Communications.

In June 2006, EV, along with all of Telex Communications, became part of Bosch Security Systems division. Today EV manufactures widely used broadcast microphones as well as loudspeakers and various other professional audio equipment.

== Superfund site ==
The former Electro-Voice facility in Buchanan, Michigan is a Superfund site. Before closing in 2000, the business was engaged in die-casting, machining, assembly, painting and electroplating activities. According to the EPA, "contamination at the site resulted from Electro-Voice's discharge of electroplating wastes into two clay-lined lagoons from 1952 to 1962, and from the disposal of paint wastes and solvents into a drywell from 1964 to 1973. The waste disposal activities caused groundwater to become contaminated with chemicals called volatile organic compounds, or VOCs. Following construction of the site's long-term remedy, operation and maintenance activities and monitoring are ongoing". Construction of the site's long-term remedy finished in 1999, with the EPA reporting, "soil cleanup included construction of a clay cap and active treatment by an in-place ventilation and volatilization system. Groundwater remediation is ongoing through monitored natural attenuation of pollutants". As of 2026 there were plans to rehabilitate the property.

== See also ==
- List of microphone manufacturers
