= Leonard Feldman =

American materials physicist

Leonard Cecil Feldman (born New York City, 8 June 1939) is an American materials physicist.

He gained his B.A. degree in 1961 from Drew University and his Ph.D. from Rutgers University in 1967. He then joined AT&T Bell Laboratories, working on semiconductor materials physics. In 1996 he assumed the position of Stevenson Professor of Physics at Vanderbilt University and Distinguished Visiting Scientist at Oak Ridge National Laboratory.

His researches have focussed the use of ion beams for the study and modification of solids, studying the surface structure of solids, mostly semiconductors, at the monolayer level. His current interest concerns the effect of ion beam on nanostructures and organic materials.

He was named Fellow of the Institute of Electrical and Electronics Engineers (IEEE) in 2016 "for contributions to semiconductor-dielectric interfaces for MOS technologies".
