= Oxford University Tape Recording Society =

Former Oxford University club of recording enthusiasts

The Oxford University Tape Recording Society (OUTRS) was a student's club of recording enthusiasts that has existed at Oxford from at least 1966 until at least 1976. Among its members were AES fellow Michael Gerzon and Peter Craven, co-inventors of the Soundfield microphone, Nimbus Records director Jonathan Halliday and sound engineer and prolific Ambisonic recordist Paul Hodges (father of pianist Nicolas Hodges).

The OUTRS' recordings have been quoted in early listening experiments on four-speaker stereo reproduction. Subsequently, the society conducted some ground-breaking experiments in full-sphere surround recording, laying the foundation for the development of the Ambisonic surround sound system.
