= List of Ambisonic hardware =

This is a list of current or legacy Ambisonic hardware.

== Currently available Ambisonic hardware ==
=== Microphone Arrays ===
Presence in this list does not indicate that the manufacturer uses the term Ambisonics for marketing or even endorses the concept at all, merely that the product produces B-format or something closely related.

- Josephson Engineering makes an integrated native horizontal B-format microphone array, the C700S
- Schoeps offers the Double-MS, an array kit consisting of two cardioids and one figure-of-eight
- Soundfield (now owned by RØDE) manufactures a range of tetrahedral microphone arrays and post-production equipment. Their SPS200 microphone is provided with software for the conversion from A-format to B-format. Rode have now supplemented the SPS200 with a similar microphone using their own capsules: the Rode NT-SF1.
- Core Sound sells the TetraMic, another tetrahedral array, and the OctoMic second-order array. These are provided with conversion software and calibration files.
- MH Acoustics has developed the EigenMike, a 32-capsule spherical microphone array capable of up to fourth-order Ambisonics
- Brahma ambisonic microphones - several tetrahedral types, with different capsule sizes - some built into a Zoom H2n recorder, and some standalone microphones outputting to four balanced microphone channels. These are supported by standard filtermatrix files and software support including BrahmaVolver (freestanding A to B Converter) and several plug in style converters. They are also developing an eight-capsule second-order microphone.
- ZYLIA ZM-1 multi-track microphone - is a special type of microphone array that was designed for high quality multi-track recording. It consists of 19 omni-directional microphone capsules distributed on a sphere (up to third order Ambisonics microphone). ZM-1 microphone together with provided software delivers sound source separation possibilities, as well as optionally generating Ambisonic outputs up to third order.
- Sennheiser offers the FOA Ambeo tetrahedral microphone. It delivers a raw 4 channel A format with available B format conversion in their free to download VST, AU, and AAX plugin.
- Twirling Technologies make a tetrahedral microphone which is available in two forms - as an accessory for a phone or tablet running Android (the Twirling 720 Lite), or combined with a stand-alone recorder (the Twirling 720 VR Audio Recorder). They provide a range of software for handling the Ambisonic signals, and are aimed at VR applications.
- Ricoh sell a tetrahedral Ambisonic microphone, the TA-1, made for them by Audio-Technica, for use with their Theta video recorder.
- Oktava make the MK-4012 4-D tetrahedral microphone.
- DPA Microphones made the DPA-4 tetrahedral microphone for a short time.
- Zoom Corporation's integrated recorder, the H2n, has a firmware update that enables it to generate horizontal B-format files directly. They have now also released a recorder, the H3-VR, with a tetrahedral microphone arrangement for full first-order Ambisonics.
- Nevaton have announced the Nevaton VR, a tetrahedral first-order Ambisonic microphone with very low self-noise.
- Reynolds Microphones makes the first-order A-Type 4 and hybrid second-order A-Type 8 microphones including the A-Format to B-Format Encoder plugin developed by Atmoky. The A-Type mics have a low noise floor, superior EMI shielding and are designed for rugged field use. Individual calibration cannot disguise poor quality, noisy capsules and electronics that are prone to interference and failure. Reynolds Mics also makes the new Tarantula microphone array, which consists of eight omni microphones mounted in 60mm acrylic APE balls, designed to capture ambiences and diffuse environments with a high degree of spaciousness.

When encoding the A-format (capsule) output from a tetrahedral microphone into B-format, the best results are obtained if the microphone has been calibrated to take account of variations in the capsules. The original microphones made by Soundfield and their current ST450 II have this calibration performed by adjustments to the hardware. The Core Sound TetraMic and the Brahma microphones are provided with individual calibration files for use with their processing software. All the other tetrahedral microphones rely on the matching of the capsules used, which is not necessarily good enough for best results. Core Sound offer a calibration service for the Soundfield SPS-200, Sennheiser Ambeo, and others, which provides a calibration file for use in their software in order to get the best Ambisonic performance from originally uncalibrated microphones.

=== Domestic surround processors/amplifiers ===
- Meridian Audio continues to offer Ambisonic B-format and UHJ support in its current line of surround controllers: G65, G61R, and 861v8
- Any sufficiently competent PC class system has, or can be given, robust support for Ambisonic processing. The exact methods depends on the system. Linux, for example, supports all Ambisonic formats, including B and UHJ. Binaural and Super Stereo can also be used. One can also map discrete formats, such as L+R or 5.1, into ambisonics, allowing one to somewhat "disconnect" the speaker configuration from the audio's discrete speaker location requirements.

== Legacy hardware ==
A popular and unfortunate misconception is that Ambisonic recordings can only be made with the SFM, and as a result there is a widespread, and erroneous, belief that Ambisonics can only be used to capture a live acoustic event (something that accounts for a tiny proportion of modern commercial recordings, the vast majority of which are built up in the studio and mixed from multitrack). This is not the case. In fact, Michael Gerzon's designs for Ambisonic panpots pre-date much of his work on soundfield microphone technology. Ambisonic panpots – which allow mono (for example) signals to be localised in B-Format space – were developed as early as the 1970s, and were incorporated into a special mixing console designed by Chris Daubney at the IBA (UK Independent Broadcasting Authority) and built by Alice Stancoil Ltd in the early 1980s for the IBA surround-sound test broadcasts.

Ambisonic panpots, with differing degrees of sophistication, provide the fundamental additional studio tool required to create an Ambisonic mix, by making it possible to localise individual, conventionally recorded multi-track or multi-mic sources around a 360° stage analogous to the way conventional stereo panpots localise sounds across a front stage. However, unlike stereo panpots, which traditionally vary only the level between two channels, Ambisonic panning provides additional cues which eliminate conventional localisation accuracy problems. This is especially pertinent to surround, where our ability to localise level-only panned sources is severely limited to the sides and rear.

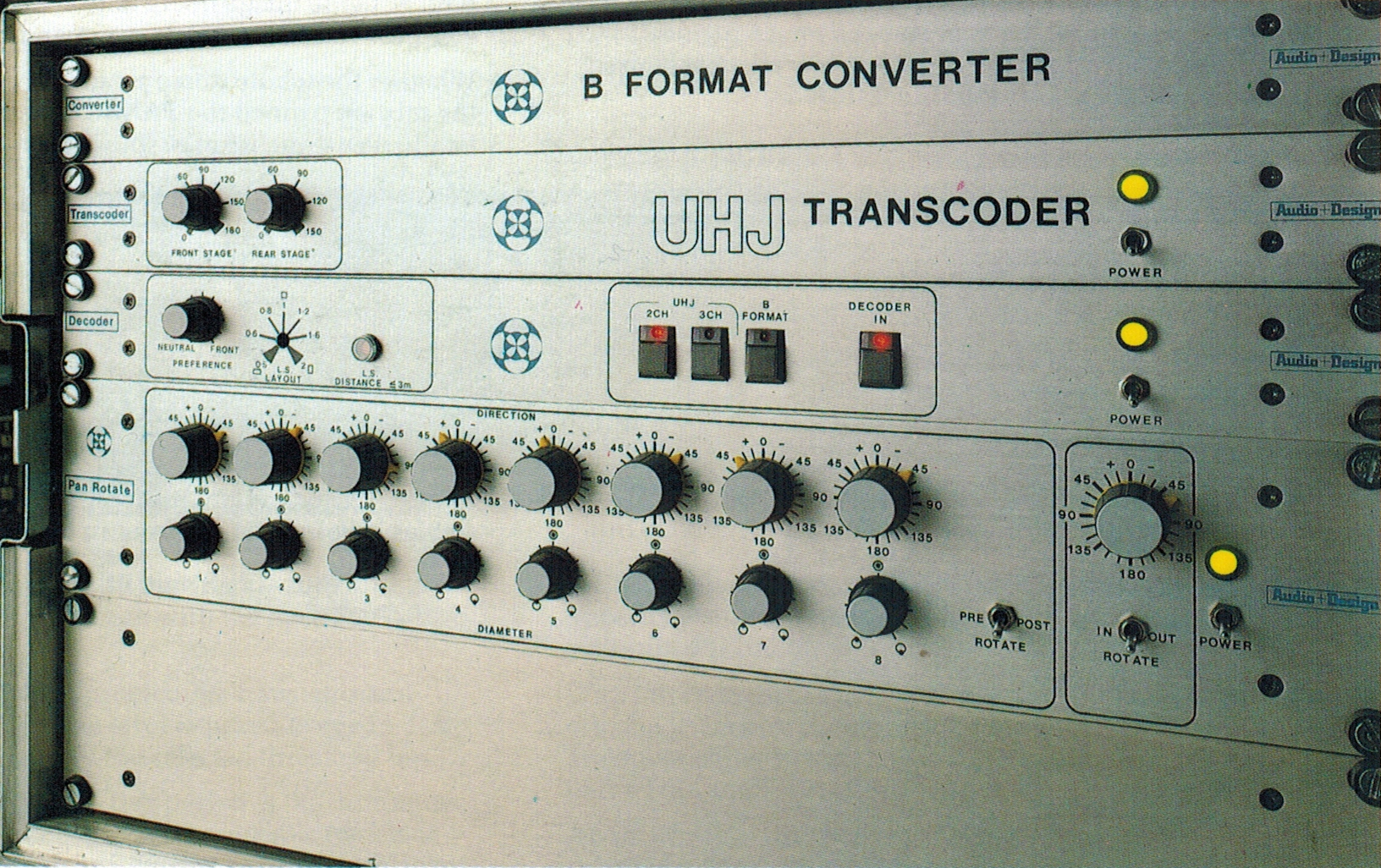
Audio & Design's Ambisonic Mastering Package. From top to bottom: The B-Format Converter, the UHJ Transcoder, the Ambisonic Decoder, and the Pan-Rotate unit.

By the early 1980s, studio hardware existed for the creation of multitrack-sourced, Ambisonically mixed content, including the ability to incorporate SFM-derived sources (for example for room ambience) into a multichannel mix. This was thanks primarily to the efforts of Dr Geoffrey Barton (now of Trifield Productions) and the pro-audio manufacturers Audio & Design Recording, UK (now Audio & Design Reading Ltd). Barton designed a suite of outboard rack-mounted studio units that became known as the Ambisonic Mastering System. These units were patched into a conventional mixing console and allowed conventional multitrack recordings to be mixed Ambisonically. The system consisted of four units:

- Pan-Rotate Unit – This enabled eight mono signals to be panned in B-format, including 360° "angle" control and a "radius vector" control allowing the source to be brought in towards the centre, plus a control to rotate an external or internal B-format signal.
- B-Format Converter – This connected to four groups and an aux send and allowed existing console panpots to pan across a B-Format quadrant.
- UHJ Transcoder – This both encoded B-Format into 2-channel UHJ (see UHJ Format) and in addition allowed a stereo front stage and a stereo rear stage (both with adjustable widths) to be transcoded direct to 2-channel UHJ.
- Ambisonic Decoder – this accepted both horizontal (WXY) B-format and 2-channel UHJ and decoded it to four speaker feeds with configurable array geometry.

It is understood that versions of these units were subsequently made available in the late 1990s by Cepiar Ltd along with some other Ambisonics hardware. It is not known if they are still currently available.

A significant number of releases were made with this equipment, all in 2-channel UHJ, including several albums on the KPM production music library label, and commercial releases such as Steve Hackett's Till We Have Faces, The Alan Parsons Project's Stereotomy, Paul McCartney's Liverpool Oratorio, Frank Perry's Zodiac, a series of albums on the Collins Classics label, and others, most of which are available on CD. See The Ambisonic Discography in the List of Ambisonic Productions for more information. Engineer John Timperley employed a transcoder on virtually all his mixes over the course of over a dozen years until his death in 2006. Unfortunately the albums, film soundtracks and other projects he created in UHJ over this period are largely undocumented at present, and thus remain unlisted in the Discography.

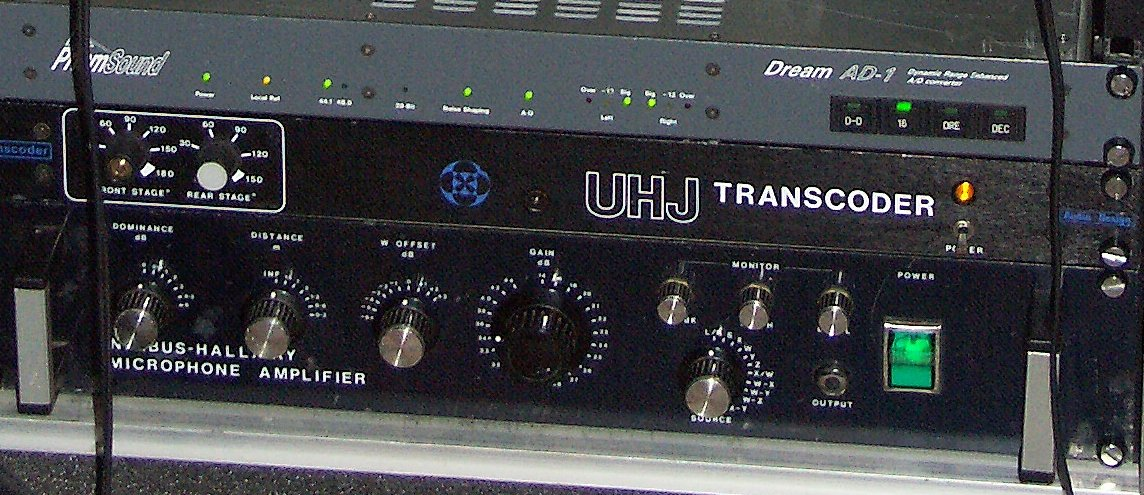
The custom preamp designed by Dr Jonathan Halliday at Nimbus, and an UHJ encoder.

The lack of availability of 4-track mastering equipment led to a tendency (now regretted by some of the people involved) to mix directly to 2-channel UHJ rather than recording B-format and then converting it to UHJ for release. The fact that you could mix direct to 2-channel UHJ with nothing more than the transcoder made this even more tempting. As a result, there is a lack of legacy Ambisonically mixed B-format recordings that could be released today in more advanced formats (such as G-Format). However, the remastering – and in some cases release – of original 2-channel UHJ recordings in G-Format has proved to be surprisingly effective, yielding results at least as good as the original studio playbacks, thanks primarily to the significantly higher quality of current decoding systems (such as file-based software decoders) compared to those available when the recordings were made.

=== Spreaders ===
Other tools included "spreaders" which were designed to "de-localise" a signal (typically by varying the virtual source angle with frequency within a determined range) – for example, in the case of reverb returns – however these were not developed further.

=== Domestic Ambisonic decoders/amplifiers ===
- NRDC-Ambisonic Decoder, a kit manufactured by Integrex Ltd, Staffordshire, which supported variable-aspect rectangular setups and hexagons, and accepted several then-common surround formats in addition to B-format and UHJ. The design was published in Wireless World July/August 1977.
- Minim AD-7 and AD-10
- IMF Electronics D20B
- Troy TA 110P, for use in the car.
- Cantares SSP-1 Surround Sound Processor, UHJ, binaural, SQ, horizontal and full-sphere B-format decoding including dominance and zoom.
- Audio+Design marketed a Reference Decoder. In addition they offered the Ambi-5 and Ambi-8 Auditorium decoders that were plugged into the 9-pin D-type Auxiliary Output of the Reference Decoder.
- Cepiar Limited made an Ambisonic decoder for up to eight speakers in a horizontal or three-dimensional array, called the Ambi-8x. It was aimed at professional users.
- Onkyo made the TX-SV909PRO receiver which included decoding of UHJ recordings. The successor product, the Onkyo 919THX, did not continue the feature.
- Mitsubishi made the DA-P7000 digital A/V control center, which included decoding of UHJ recordings.
- Abacoid made the PAD 9211 Professional Ambisonic Decoder.

=== Super stereo ===
A feature of domestic Ambisonic decoders has been the inclusion of a super stereo feature. This allows conventional stereo signals to be "wrapped around" the listener, using some of the capabilities of the decoder. A control is provided that allows the width to be varied between mono-like and full surround. This provides a useful capability for a listener to get more from their existing stereo collection.

A different kind of "super stereo" is experienced by listeners to a 2-channel UHJ signal who are not using a decoder. Because of the inter-channel phase relationships inherent in the encoding scheme, the listener experiences stereo that is often significantly wider than the loudspeakers. It is also often more stable and offers superior imaging.

Both features were used as selling points in the early days of Ambisonics, and especially Ambisonic mixing. It helped to overcome a "chicken and egg" situation where record companies were reluctant to release Ambisonic recordings because there were few decoders in the marketplace, while hi-fi manufacturers were unwilling to license and incorporate Ambisonic decoders in their equipment because there was not very much mainstream released content. On the one hand, it was worth having a decoder because you could get more out of your existing record collection; while on the other it was worth making Ambisonic recordings because even people without a decoder could gain appreciable benefits.
