= Michael Gerzon =

English audio engineer (1945–1996)

- Born: 4 December 1945; Birmingham, England
- Died: 6 May 1996 (aged 50); Oxford, England
- Citizenship: British
- Education: University of Oxford
- Known for: Ambisonics; Soundfield microphone Noise-shaped dither Trifield; Meridian Lossless Packing
- Awards: AES Fellowship (1978); AES Gold Medal (1991); AES Publications Award (1999)
- Scientific career
- Fields: Sound recording and reproduction
- Workplaces: University of Oxford; Independent consultant

Michael Anthony Gerzon (4 December 1945 – 6 May 1996) is probably best known for his work on Ambisonics and for his work on digital audio. He also made a large number of recordings, many in the field of free improvisation in which he had a particular interest.

== Life ==
After studying mathematics at the University of Oxford, Gerzon joined Oxford's Mathematical Institute working on axiomatic quantum theory, until his work in audio took him into working as a consultant. At university he already had a keen interest in both the theory and practice of recording, which he shared with a few fellow students including Peter Craven (the two were later the co-inventors of the soundfield microphone, and collaborated on many other projects).

Over the next few years, this interest led to the invention of Ambisonics, which can be seen as a theoretical and practical completion of the work done by Alan Blumlein in the field of stereophonic sound. Although Ambisonics was not a commercial success, its theory underpinned much of his later work in audio such as his work with Waves Audio and Trifield. He was also active in the development of digital sound techniques, such as noise-shaped dither and Meridian Lossless Packing (MLP, the lossless compression used in DVD-Audio disks).

The Audio Engineering Society recognised Gerzon's work in audio by awarding him a fellowship in 1978 and the AES Gold Medal in 1991. He was also awarded the AES Publications Award posthumously in 1999.

== Death ==
Gerzon died in 1996 from complications resulting from a severe asthma attack.

== Tape archive ==
The British Library Sound Archive contains Gerzon's collection of tapes, which he kept from his student days. The collection consists of 400 hours of recordings. A direct link to the collection is not possible; a search for the Collection title "Michael Gerzon tapes" will find them all by track. (An advanced search for Call Number "C236" with varying suffix numbers is a useful alternative that finds by tape.) Readers with a British Library card can book to hear tapes by appointment.

== See also ==
- The Snake Decides (1988), which he engineered
- Live Improvisations (1992), which he recorded
- On a Friday, whom he recorded
- The Jennifers, whom he recorded
- Ambisonics
- Oxford University Tape Recording Society, of which he was a member
- Soundfield microphone
- Noise-shaped dither
- Trifield
- Meridian Lossless Packing
