= Imm sound =

imm sound
- Company type: Private
- Industry: Cinema sound Immersive 3D Sound; Audio Post Production
- Founded: 2010
- Headquarters: Diagonal 177, Barcelona, Spain
- Area served: Worldwide
- Products: imm 3DSP Sound Processor, Immersive Audio Workstation
- Website: immsound.com

imm sound was a privately owned company based in Barcelona, Spain, specializing in 3D sound technology and post production for the cinema and other media industries. After the installation in September 2009 by the company Iosono at Chinese Theater at Los Angeles, Immsound became In November 2010 the second cinema sound company to install cinema theaters capable of reproducing channel free soundtracks. The company was finally acquired by Dolby in July 2012.

== History ==
imm sound started operations in 2010, acquiring the license for worldwide exploitation of the results of the innovations in audio technology developed at the R&D company Barcelona Media. The company provided technology and services for full 3D sound deployment in the cinema industry worldwide.

The first fully operational venues were equipped in autumn 2010, in Araújo Cinemas, Maringá, Brazil. By May 2012, the installations worldwide include cinema theatres in the United States, China, Ireland, Germany, Austria, France, Brazil, Korea, Japan, Italy, and Spain. These cinemas play both native imm sound 3D content and optionally use 3D upmix in real-time for alternative content. The Impossible, mixed using imm sound technology, will be released in October 2012.

== Technology ==
The main philosophy behind imm sound technology was a channel free approach to audio spatialization, whereby the concept of audio channel is eradicated from post-production and distribution. The creation of imm 3D soundtracks is done without regard to the loudspeaker(s) layout(s) where they are to be exhibited. This reduces complexity in the creative process and eliminates all channel-based decisions. Instead, engineers may concentrate on the spatial properties of sound elements without having to think about which loudspeakers are actually playing. Cinemas and other exhibition venues are free to choose the number and positions of loudspeakers that best fit their architectural needs and constraints, while ensuring that the soundtrack will be played back exactly as intended. The number and positions of loudspeakers in the studio may hereby differ from that of the exhibition space.

The technology can also reproduce a 3D soundtrack into today's conventional formats, like 5.1, 7.1 or any future multi-loudspeaker format. The reverse is also possible: any given loudspeaker layout may also be simulated in the actual physical loudspeaker layout using the concept of virtual speakers. All proposed and to-be-proposed multi-speaker layouts are part of embraced by this technology, thus rendering future channel based approaches obsolete.

The system employs its own spatial sound processing algorithms, combining object-based approaches and higher-order ambisonics. This allows not only for the use of any microphone array solution as well as on-site recordings done with 3D microphones (such as the Soundfield and Eigenmike), but also makes native 3D plug-ins, especially 3D reverb algorithms, possible.

imm sound audio processors, as well as imm sound post-production tools, also include 3D upmix technology, capable of real-time conversion of any stereo, 5.1 or 7.1 input format to imm sound channel-free 3D format. It analyses the original signals and, via a physical and psycho-acoustical inference process, generates full 3D soundscapes while respecting the sacred law in cinema of leaving in the screen all dialogues, direct sounds of instruments, etc. While its main use is in post-production, fully operational cinema theatres use it for alternative content, too.
