= Trifield =

The Trifield process is a form of audio rendering in which a conventional two-channel signal is decoded (using Ambisonic principles) to an additional number of loudspeakers, typically three in the form of a Left-Centre-Right front stage. The technique provides significant additional image stability, especially when the listener is moving or off-axis.

It was developed by Dr Geoffrey Barton, a major figure in the "second wave" of original Ambisonics development, and Michael Gerzon. It should not be confused with a Yamaha system with a similar name.

Trifield also has applications in conventional surround mixing. There are several problems involved in mixing with an additional centre front channel for many engineers. The channel itself was originally designed for dialogue in matrix cinema surround systems and does not have a direct application in music mixing, where a 2-speaker stereo stage is generally, and traditionally, employed.

Many studio engineers with a background in conventional stereo music mixing find that simple panning of a source to the centre-front (CF) channel makes it fail to blend in with the stereo mix. However, if the CF channel is left silent, consumers may believe there is a fault with the disc or with their equipment. A way around this problem is offered by Trifield. The processor typically takes a 2-channel L-R signal and renders it for L-C-R, and no signals are sent to the CF except for those generated by the Trifield processor. Not only does CF content now blend with the mix: in addition, the resulting soundstage is more stable and listener-position independent, while the listener can confirm that something is actually emerging from their centre-front loudspeaker.

== See also ==
- Ambisonics
- Meridian Audio, Ltd., who include the technique in their surround processors
- Stereophonic sound
