= Mixed-order Ambisonics =

It is possible to define an Ambisonic signal set with non-uniform resolution depending on source direction. This practice is called mixed-order, and it has consequences for the layout and interpretation of files, streams, or physical connections in Ambisonic data exchange. As with all things Ambisonic, complexity has increased as research progressed, and the term has grown to include new concepts which were not anticipated when Ambisonics was first invented in the 1970s.

When dealing with subsets of the multipole expansion, the base ordering of the components (according to whatever ordering scheme has been agreed on) is usually not changed. Instead, the unused components are simply left out, or, where bandwidth or space is not at a premium, zeroed.

== True Mixed-order schemes ==
=== Horizontal-only ===
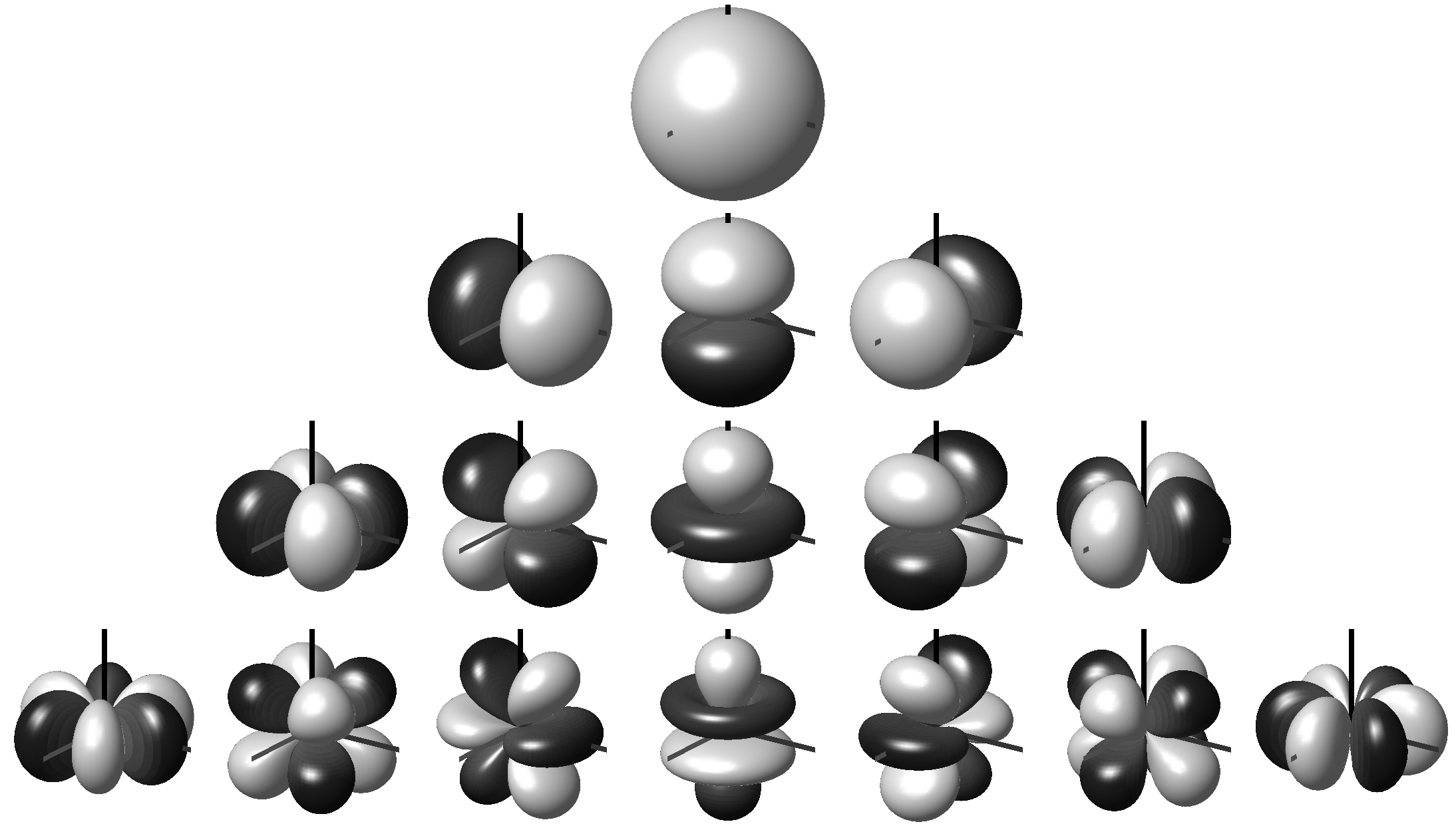
The Ambisonic components up to third order.

Horizontal-only recordings or mixes are the most commonly encountered mixed-order signals, because the horizontal plane is by far the most likely location of musical or other performers, and the vast majority of playback systems deployed today does not have height capability.

Horizontal-only signal sets are derived by following along the edges of the pyramid of spherical harmonics (see illustration) and taking only the outermost components. The other components in each order have either nulls on their equators or lobes with broader expansion than the outer ones, adding no additional resolution information.

=== Superimposed horizontal and full-sphere signals (#H#P) ===
Often, height localisation is of secondary importance and full-sphere information is only sought for a more pleasant rendering of diffuse room reverberation. Hence, it is customary to take a first-order recording of a tetrahedral microphone for ambiance and augment it with artificially panned direct signals or spot microphones in higher order on the equator, resulting for example in a 2H1P (or second-order horizontal, superimposed with a first-order periphonic) signal.

If sources are concentrated on the horizontal plane, this approach is quite efficient in terms of bandwidth and reproduction complexity. However, such a system has an often-overlooked misfeature: as soon as a source leaves the equator, its sharpness and area of satisfactory reconstruction degrades rapidly to that of the (lower) periphonic order.

=== Complete mixed-order sets (#H#V) ===
To address this issue, Travis (2009) suggested an augmented mixed-order scheme which retains its horizontal resolution even for elevated sources, while limiting the lower order "smear" to the vertical dimension. For such sets, he introduced the #H#V notation, where #H denotes the horizontal and #V the vertical resolution, with the understanding that they will be constant for all source positions on the sphere.

#H#V sets are derived by following the pyramid of spherical harmonics along the edges, taking the $(\#V+1)$ outermost components of each row on each side. For example, a 3H2V set has 15 components, leaving out only the third-order z-rotationally symmetric one in the middle of the bottom row. Since the savings in terms of bandwidth during transmission with this scheme are usually minimal, it is most often employed on the decoding side when the loudspeaker density is not quite sufficient for full-sphere high-order decoding. It is particularly beneficial to minimize resolution loss on the popular stacked-ring speaker layouts.

With the introduction of #H#V, it has become impossible to uniquely identify the mixed-order signal sets by the number of component channels.

== Signals defined for particular subsets of the sphere ==
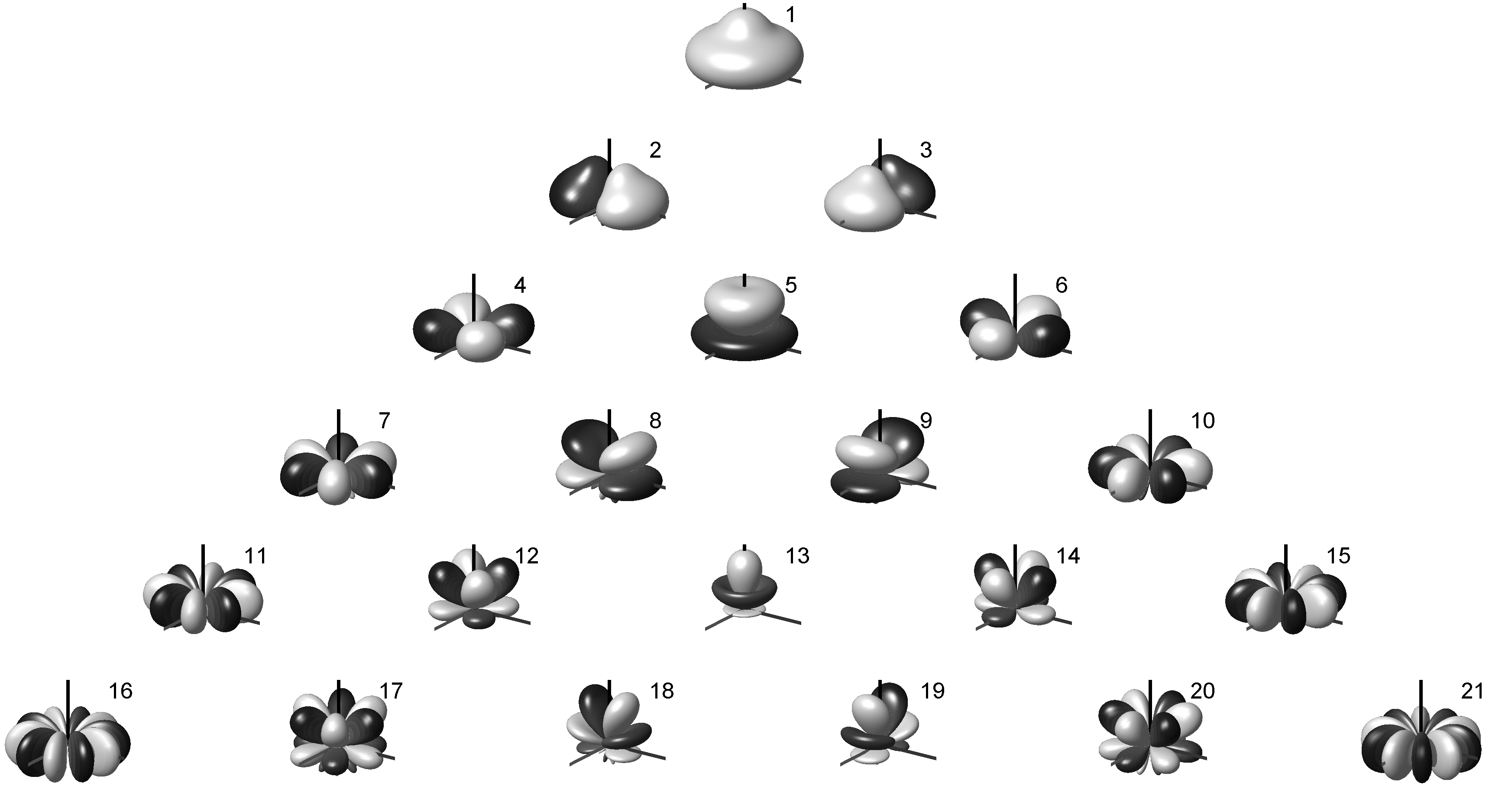
A proposed set of basis functions for decoding to a hemispherical speaker layout.

In their basic AmbiX file format proposal, Nachbar et al. (2009) deal with mixed-order signals by zeroing the unneeded components, with the understanding that any lossless compression algorithm used on an AmbiX file prior to transmission will deal with this situation efficiently.

However, they also propose an extended specification which makes use of an adaptor matrix that maps arbitrary data formats (such as legacy Furse-Malham signals) to the desired standardized outputs, and encompasses both #H#P and #H#V mixed order schemes. Furthermore, it can deal with input that is defined only for a subset of the sphere, such as a hemisphere or an even more constrained "window". Such a reduced input set would miss some components, and rely on the adaptor matrix to get mapped to a fully periphonic output signal set again.

This approach would in theory allow for a more compact transmission format if the part of the sphere relevant for reproduction is known in advance.
