= Soundfield microphone =

Type of microphone

The Soundfield microphone is an audio microphone composed of four closely spaced subcardioid or cardioid (unidirectional) microphone capsules arranged in a tetrahedron. It was invented by Michael Gerzon and Peter Craven, and is a part of, but not exclusive to, Ambisonics, a surround sound technology. It can function as a mono, stereo or surround sound microphone, optionally including height information.

== History ==
The Soundfield microphone was invented by Michael Gerzon and Peter Craven. Their theoretical design was developed into a practical microphone system by Calrec Audio Limited, who launched the first Soundfield microphone in 1978.

In 1993, the Soundfield microphone part of Calrec was separated out as the company SoundField Limited, who further developed the range of products. Since the original patents relating to the Soundfield microphone expired, other companies have started to manufacture Soundfield microphones.

In 2016, the parent company of RØDE Microphones, The Freedman Group, acquired SoundField from then-owner TSL Products. As well as keeping the existing range of SoundField microphones and processors in production, RØDE launched a collaboration marque, 'SoundField By RØDE'. The first microphone under the collaboration, the SoundField By RØDE NTSF-1, was released in September 2018.

== Signals ==
A Soundfield microphone kit, consisting of the microphone and a signal processor, produces two distinct sets of audio signals called A-Format and B-Format. The sound processor may be either dedicated hardware, or a computer running software. The software processing may be done in real-time during the recording, or later offline.

=== A-Format ===
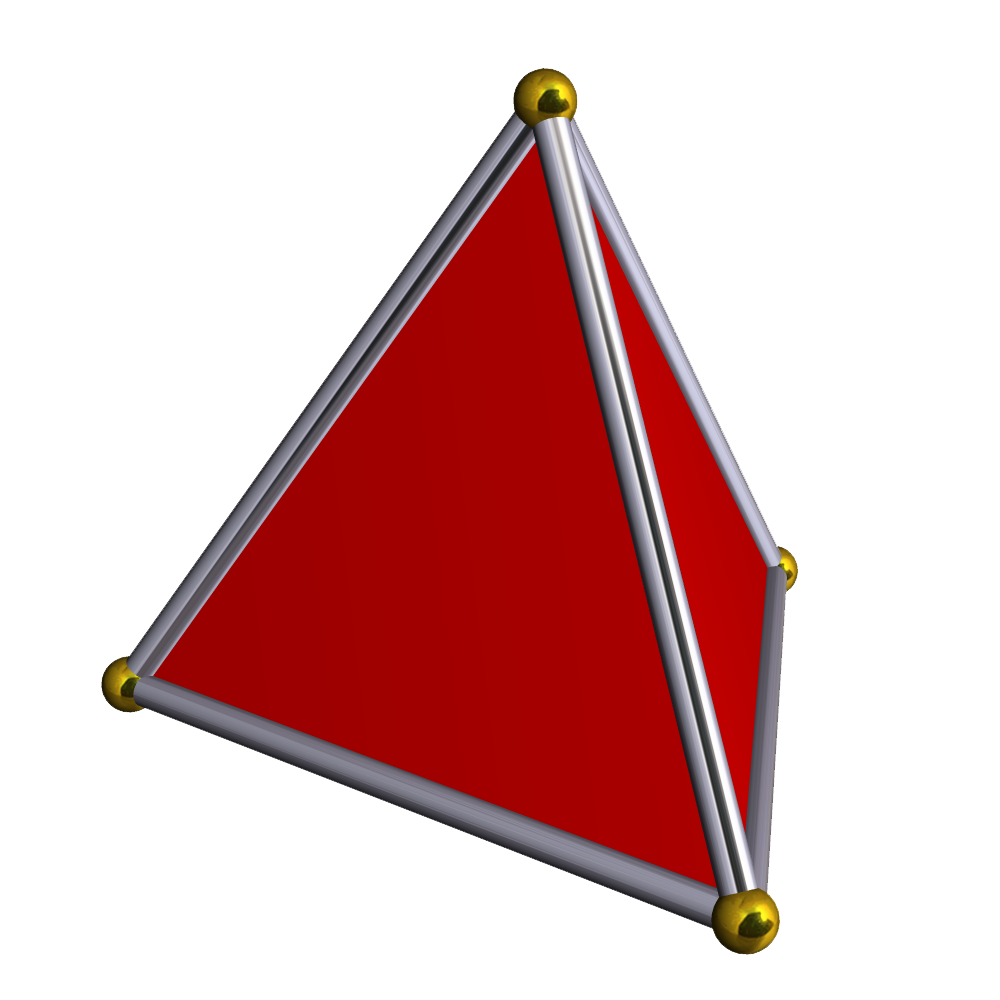
The A-Format is the signals from four microphones on the faces of a tetrahedron.

The first set, the A-Format, is produced by the Soundfield microphone itself and consists of the four signals from the microphone capsules. These four signals are not intended to be used without further processing. The A-Format is normally transformed into the second set of audio signals, the B-Format. This process is described in the two sources listed under Further reading. Depending on the microphone model, this transformation can be performed in either hardware or software.

=== B-Format ===
The B-Format is the standard audio format produced by a soundfield kit. It consists of the following four signals:

- W – a pressure signal corresponding to the output from an omnidirectional microphone
- X – the front-to-back directional information, a forward-pointing velocity or "figure-of-eight" microphone
- Y – the left-to-right directional information, a leftward-pointing "figure-of-eight" microphone
- Z – the up-to-down directional information, an upward-pointing "figure-of-eight" microphone

These are the constant (W) and linear (X, Y, Z) terms in the multipole expansion of a function on the sphere – in effect, it approximates the wave field on a sphere around the microphone.

It is possible to recreate the three-dimensional soundfield, however the soundfield microphone particularly shows its versatility in a stereo or mono application. For example, a forward-facing cardioid is produced by$\sqrt2 W + X$. By combining the signals in various proportions, it is possible to derive any number of first-order microphones, pointing in any direction, before and after recording. For instance, provided the W, X, Y and Z signals are recorded separately, it is possible to pinpoint the microphone to a certain response from the audience even after recording. Examples of software that perform these calculations are Visual Virtual Microphone, SoundField's Surround Zone and Ambisonic Studio's B2X decoders plug-ins.

In other words, the B-format recording can be decoded to model any number of microphones pointing in arbitrary directions: each microphone's pattern can be selected to be omnidirectional, cardioid, hypercardioid, figure-of-eight, or anything in between. This can be done live or in post-production (after the recording is made).

The playback configuration is equally flexible. Again in post-production, the B-format recording can be decoded to any number of speakers arranged in both the horizontal and vertical planes.

Note however that this information only allows the direction of sound at the microphone to be reproduced – microphone responses pointing in any direction can be synthesized, but it does not allow the reconstruction of what a microphone at a different point in space would record. To do that requires reconstructing the wave field in more detail (as in wave field synthesis).
