= Corruption in the Suvarnabhumi Airport project =

Allegations of corruption during the development of Suvarnabhumi Airport, the newest international airport serving Bangkok, Thailand, have been made since the project's inception. These allegations started in the 1970s, when land for the airport was purchased during the dictatorship of Thanom Kittikachorn, and extended to the government of Thaksin Shinawatra, during which most of the construction occurred.

The Nation, a Thai English-language daily, published several reports alleging corruption in the purchase of x-ray baggage scanning devices for the airport. The resulting scandal delayed the opening of the airport by a year and allowed the opposition Democrat Party to initiate a 20-hour no-confidence censure debate that forced Thaksin to remove close supporter Suriya Jungrungreangkit from his position of Transport Minister. The Royal Thai Army swept into power in a military coup in 2006, using the allegedly shoddy construction of the airport as one of the justifications for its coup. The junta initiated several investigations into the airport. The investigative panels found that damage to the airport was "minute" and "common." The cost of fixing the damage was estimated at less than 1% of the total airport cost. The junta was accused of delaying airport repairs and intensifying the airport's problems in order to pin further blame on the deposed government.

In 2008, The Nation admitted that its reports of corruption were incorrect, and retracted their stories.

The Council for National Security (CNS) in Thailand established the Assets Examination Committee (AEC) in 2006 to investigate actions that caused damage to the state from operations or projects by individuals in the Cabinet of Prime Minister Thaksin Shinawatra. The AEC initially took on eight cases for examination, but later added an additional five cases, for a total of 13 cases that were investigated. One of these cases involved the procurement of CTX explosive detection machines for Suvarnabhumi Airport, and the AEC decided to take legal action against 25 individuals, including Thaksin Shinawatra and other politicians, state officials, and business people, for their involvement in a rigged auction involving the organizers and participants of the auction. The AEC also accused these individuals of abuse of position, corruption, and neglecting their duties or acting dishonestly, causing harm. After completing the investigation, the AEC submitted the indictment to the Attorney General's Office in 2011, but the case was referred to the National Anti-Corruption Commission (NACC) due to objections from the Attorney General's Office about the incompleteness of the case. The joint committee between the Attorney General and NACC has been unable to reach a decision on the case for several years.

== Overview ==
Charges of corruption were levelled against Thai governments since the airport project's inception in the 1970s. "All the recent previous governments before Thaksin took part in taking something from the project," noted Chaiwat Sinsuwong, a member of the Council of Engineers.

Mr Weera Somkuamkit, of the People's Network on Corruption has noted that "Someone got a big payoff just by laying down the sand. There's corruption in every airport project such as the car park, bidding on duty-free shops, cooling system for the buildings and power generating system." Weera Somkuamkit has not yet made public any evidence supporting his claims. Based on this and other allegations, the opposition parties during the Thaksin government initiated a vote of no confidence against the Thaksin-government's transport minister. The censure motion was not successful.

After the coup, the Council for National Security (CNS) called on relevant officials to discuss the issue of corruption, including Kranarong Jantik, former secretary-general of the National Anti-Corruption Commission (NACC), and Jaruvan Maintaka, Auditor General of the State Audit Office of the Kingdom of Thailand (SAO), to prepare for the establishment of an organization to check for corruption in the government of Thaksin Shinawatra. On September 30, 2006, the Council for National Security announced the appointment of the Assets Examination Committee (AEC) to investigate actions that cause damage to the state from operations or projects by individuals in the Cabinet of the Prime Minister Thaksin Shinawatra.

The process of the AEC begins with the submission of already-investigated and data-gathered cases by the State Audit Office of the Kingdom of Thailand. Initially, the AEC takes on a total of 8 cases for examination, with an additional 5 cases added later, for a total of 13 cases that the AEC investigates. One of them has a CTX explosive detection machine procurement project for Suvarnabhumi Airport included, and the Assets Examination Committee has decided to take legal action against the political figures, including Thaksin Shinawatra, as the Chairman of the Suvarnabhumi Airport Development Committee (ADC), and other politicians, including Suriya Juangroongruangkit, ex-Minister of Transport, as well as state officials and employees, board members and executives of the New Bangkok International Airport Company Limited (NBIA) and Thai Airports Company Limited (TAC), such as Sisuk Jantharangsi, the Minister of Transport, Chaikasem Nitisiri, the attorney general, ITO Trading Group as a legal entity and business people, a total of 25 people.

The AEC has issued a resolution to pursue a case against these individuals in relation to a rigged auction involving the organizers and participants of the auction, resulting in unfair competition (violation of the State Enterprise Act B.E. 2542, sections 5, 11, 12, 13).

The case also involves abuse of position and corruption by the perpetrators and accomplices in several counts (Criminal Code, sections 83, 86, 90, 91, 144, 149, 152, 157, 341).

Additionally, as government employees, these people are also accused of neglecting their duties or acted dishonestly, causing harm (Public Sector Employee Discipline Act of 1959, sections 3, 9, 11). The commission has also requested that the accused return or compensate for damages in the amount of 6.937 million baht.

This investigation differs from the previous investigation led by the Inspection Committee, headed by Thaksin Shinawatra, which concluded that "no irregularities were found".

After the investigation was completed, the AEC made the decision to pursue legal action and submitted the indictment to the Attorney General's Office on May 28, 2011, one month before the AEC term ended. However, at the time, the Attorney General, Chaiyakasem Nitisiri, himself was facing his own charges in the CTX case and the AEC was forced to separate Chaiyakasem's case and file the lawsuit themselves.

On June 27, 2011, just three days before the AEC's term ended, they had already made the decision to pursue legal action against the perpetrators and submitted the indictment to the Attorney General's Office. However, the Attorney General's Office raised objections to the incompleteness of the case and requested that the AEC form a committee to review the incomplete aspects of the case. The AEC was unable to comply with this request as their term was ending in just a few days. Because of this, the investigation had been referred to National Anti-Corruption Commission (NACC) for further action by default. Mr. Kranarong Jantik, being a member of NACC as well, had recused himself from this investigation because he was a former member of AEC, which is considered to have a stake in the matter.

The joint committee between the Attorney General and NACC has been deadlocked and unable to reach a decision on this case for more than three years. Finally, in September 2011, the Attorney General ruled to dismiss the case, citing insufficient evidence as the reason. In response, the NACC prepared to file a lawsuit on its own and appointed a prosecutor from the Lawyers Council Under the Royal Patronage to handle the case.

In preparing to file a lawsuit on its own, the National Anti-Corruption Commission (NACC) has had to summarize the new allegations and gather additional evidence. In this effort, the NACC has sought cooperation from the US Department of Justice to provide additional documentation from the Federal Bureau of Investigation (FBI), totaling more than 5,000 pages. A key piece of evidence is a confirmation from the US Department of Justice, sent in early August 2012, stating that no evidence was found of payment or receipt of any benefits from the sale of CTX explosives detection equipment. Finally, on August 28, 2012, Wichai Wiwitsevi, a member of the National Counter Corruption Commission (NCCC), announced officially that the NCCC had resolved to refer the case involving the procurement and installation of CTX explosives detection equipment and the construction of baggage handling systems at Suvarnabhumi Airport to the Office of the Attorney General for prosecution.

== Car park ==
The airport contains 2 5-storey car park buildings with a combined capacity of 5,000 cars.

Two videos were released in which car park contractor Latthapol Kesakotin, in one video, claimed that he paid US$250 million to Yaowaret Shinawatra (the Prime Minister's sister) to gain a contract to build and operate the airport car park, and another video in which he claimed he didn't pay anything to Yaowaret. He later publicly denied that he paid anything to Yaowaret.

== Bomb detectors ==
Twenty-six CTX 9000 DSi explosive detection x-ray baggage scanning devices were purchased from GE Invision with a total contract value of US$65 million. In response to concerns from the International Air Transport Association (IATA) that the 26 devices would not be sufficient, the equipment specifications were revised and another 20 devices were acquired. The new specifications also required modification of several other elements of the airport. The CTX 9000 model was selected by the airport primary contractor's design consultant, Cage Inc. The choice was also endorsed by New Bangkok International Airport's independent adviser, Quatrotec Inc.

The Nation published reports claiming corruption in the purchase of the CTX bomb scanners. Abhisit Vejjajiva, leader of the opposition Democrat Party, initiated an unsuccessful censure debate against Transport Minister Suriya Jungrungreangkit. The opposition alleged that in November 2004, Suriya had known that Invision was under investigation by the US Department of Justice, and therefore would not be able to provide the bomb scanners on schedule, and despite this knowledge, had approved of payments for the bomb scanners to the airport contractor (the ITO joint venture) and bomb-scanner sub-contractor, Patriot Business Consultants. The opposition claimed that one billion baht (US$25 million) could have been saved if the bomb scanners were purchased directly from GE InVision rather than going through the two local contractors. The opposition did not win the censure motion, and subsequent investigations cleared Suriya Jungrungreangkit of any wrongdoing. The scandal delayed the opening of Suvarnabhumi Airport by over a year.

In 2008, The Nation admitted that its reports of corruption were incorrect.

== Suvarnabhumi City ==
In October 2005, the government of Thaksin Shinawatra floated a proposal to combine several districts around Suvarnabhumi Airport into a new province, to be managed as a special administrative zone. These districts would include Samut Prakan's Bang Sao Thong sub-district and Bang Phli district as well as Lat Krabang and Prawet districts of Bangkok. The new province would allow speedier large scale investments in infrastructure by enabling the government to bypass administrative and budgetary constraints for the estimated THB500 billion (US$12.5 billion) in public and private sector. The new zone, to be known as "Nakhon Suvarnabhumi" (Suvarnabhumi City) would cover 521 square kilometres (roughly the size of Singapore) with a population of about 462,000 people. In 2006 the cabinet approved in principle a draft Nakhon Suvarnabhumi Bill prepared by the interior ministry. The Council of State will then review it, followed by a series of public hearings, before the bill is submitted to the House of Representatives.

There were anonymous allegations that the proposed establishment of the new zone would cause property values to increase, and that government politicians had bought large plots of land in speculation. However, the opening of the airport caused property prices to fall 40-50% in an estimated 4,000 rai of land surrounding the airport from 2005 to 2006 due to increased noise levels. An anonymous source had earlier informed The Nation newspaper that "My friend told me that a politician's wife had bought 4,000 rai from a developer...The transaction was wrapped up in the first quarter of this year [2006]". The source also noted that prominent developers like Land & Houses, Quality Houses, Property Perfect, Supalai, LPN Development, SC Asset Corp, as well as the Jungrungreangkit and Mahagitsiri families owned large tranches in the proposed zone. Several developers denied that their ownership of land was related in any way to the proposal and noted that the properties were bought years before.

The plans for Suvarnabhumi City were largely scrapped by post-coup Finance Minister Pridiyathorn Devakula.

== Post-coup Investigations ==
=== Purging of management ===
The Royal Thai Army overthrew the Thaksin government in September 2006, using the allegedly shoddy construction of the airport as one of the justifications for its coup.

After the coup, numerous public accusations were made that construction standards of the airport were sub-standard and that cracks were appearing in the runway. Junta leader Saprang Kalayanamitr forced AOT President Chotisak Asapaviriya to resign and also dismissed the directors of Suvarnabhumi Airport and AOT Commercial Operations.

=== Junta-led investigations ===
A junta-appointed panel of engineers assigned to inspect the airport noted that damage to the airport was "minute," and "common." This was contrary to public accusations that the airport was seriously damaged after only four months of operation. A spokesman for British Airways also said that "everything is normal," and that "We haven't heard any complaints from the staff." A two-week investigation led by Tortrakul Yomnak, a chief engineer for AOT, found that the runway was safe, and that cracks could be repaired in as little as a few hours. At the beginning of the investigation, Tortrakul had warned that the airport might need to be closed for three years.

=== AOT-led investigations ===
The Assistant Secretary-General of the junta was appointed Chairman of the Board at Airports of Thailand. He initiated a comprehensive study of problems at the airport. The completed study showed that the cost of fixing 60 identified problems at the airport would be less than 1% of the total airport cost and that the problems could be fixed in four to five years. Dr. Narupol Chaiyut, a member of a committee overseeing service problems at the new airport, estimated that 70% of the problems would be fixed in 2007.

=== Engineering Institute of Thailand investigations ===
The Engineering Institute of Thailand (EIT) conducted investigations at the airport in late 2006 after signs of distress were spotted at several locations in Suvarnabhumi's taxiways and taxi lanes. Rutting was found in five of the six taxi lanes and one of the six taxiways. Plastic deformation of the asphalt wearing course was observed near the takeoff position of the runway. However, the investigators noted that plastic deformation at this location was a common phenomenon and only routine maintenance was required to repair the distress. Aside from this surface distortion, both runways were in good structural condition.

Further investigations found that taxi lane and taxiway rutting was caused by separation of the asphalt binder from the aggregate surface due to prolonged water infiltration into the asphalt concrete base course, a phenomenon known as "stripping." The 23 cm thick base course is the top-most layer of the tarmac. Core samples indicated that the concrete base course material contained the correct job mix and aggregate gradation. Below the base course are the binder course, and the cement-treated base.

Detailed investigations found that water seepage was evident along the rims of the expansion joints in the cement-tested base, indicating that a large quantity of water was still trapped in the sand blanket (the bottom-most layer of the tarmac). It was found that water trapped in the sand blanket was fully confined with no connection to the pavement areas of the airport. A later investigation by the AOT identified several potential reasons for the trapped water in the sand blanket. The AOT's findings were disputed by several experts.

The EIT sent a formal warning to AOT in November 2006 about the urgent need to drain water from beneath the tarmac, and the need for immediate action. "The AOT did nothing about the problem," Suebsak Promboon of the EIT noted. "The situation might not have become this bad if the water had been drained then".

In a public statement on 15 February 2007, the EIT again strongly recommended that trapped water should be drained out urgently to minimise the potential spread of cracks. Karun Chandrarangsu, president of EIT, noted, "Suvarnabhumi is like a patient in a coma who continues to suffer from severe bleeding. Stopping the blood flow now is more urgent and important than debating what caused the injury."

=== Repairs and further criticisms ===
Prime Minister Surayud Chulanont and AOT Chairman General Saprang Kalayanamitr refused to authorize repairs on the airport tarmac. Suebsak Promboon, a senior foundation engineer and a member of the Tortrakul Yomnak-led airport tarmac inspection panel, accused the AOT of refusing to take action to solve the problems at the airport.

Critics noted that junta-led investigations were unlikely to reveal an impartial picture of the airport's shortcomings. "Problems are normal for any new airport. In our case it's made more complex because everybody wants to run down the former prime minister", noted Sumet Jumsai, a leading Thai architect. Leading engineers were sharply divided over the root causes of problems faced by the new airport.

There was a conflict of interest in the investigation because the attorney general responsible for prosecuting the case was also one of the board member of Airports of Thailand Public Company Limited (AOT) who was being prosecuted. The individuals in question are Chaiyasit Nititharaj, and in the end, he ruled not to prosecute Thaksin Shinawatra. After the decision not to prosecute the aforementioned case, Chaiyasit Nititharaj received the position of Minister of Justice and chairman of the Securities and Exchange Commission, and advisor to the Center for Maintaining Peace and Order in the Yingluck Shinawatra government.

== See also ==
- Suvarnabhumi Airport
- Nakhon Suvarnabhumi Province
- Thaksin Shinawatra
- Suriya Jungrungreangkit
- Abhisit Vejjajiva
- Thailand political crisis 2005-2006
