= Namsung =

South Korean electronics company

- Native name: 남성
- Company type: public limited company
- Industry: Conglomerate
- Founded: 1965; 61 years ago
- Founder: Yoon Bong-Soo
- Headquarters: Seoul, South Korea
- Area served: Worldwide
- Products: Consumer electronics, real estate
- Services: Advertising, information and communications technology, retail
- Revenue: ▼KRW 69.1 billion (2014)
- Number of employees: 1,500
- Subsidiaries: Namsung Telecom; Nasco; Dreamer; Namsung International; Namsung America
- Website: Namsung.com

- Namsung
- Hangul: 남성
- RR: Namseong
- MR: Namsŏng

Namsung (Korean: 남성; Korean pronunciation: [namsʌŋ]) is a South Korean multinational company headquartered in Seoul. Namsung was founded by Yoon Bong-Soo in 1965 as an OEM electronics manufacturing company. Namsung's subsidiaries include Namsung Telecom, Dreamer, Namsung International, and Namsung America.

Namsung America (Dual Electronics Corp) produces and sells a wide selection of mobile electronics, marine electronics, home audio, and GPS receivers under the Dual, Axxera, and Jensen brands. Dual Electronics Corporation is headquartered in Heathrow, Florida, with distribution centers in Nevada and Illinois.

== History ==
Namsung's important milestones are listed below.

1965 Established Namsung
1973 Manufacture and export of black and white TV
1974 Manufacture and export of color TV (1st in South Korea)
1976 Established Namsung Telecom
1976 Tin Order of Industrial Service Merit
1981 Bronze Order of Industrial Service Merit
1982 Iron Order of Industrial Service Merit
1987 Silver Order of Industrial Service Merit
1989 Listed on Korea Stock Exchange
1991 Established Namsung International, Ltd.
1993 Established Namsung Electronic, Ltd.
2000 Established Dreamer, Ltd.
2002 Construction of PLAZA CAMELLIA Mall in Seoul
2002 Construction of CROWN PLAZA in Seoul
2003 Manufacture and export of Dual (brand) electronics
2003 Established Namsung America, Ltd.
2004 Established Dreamer i, Ltd.
2005 Construction of NAMSUNG PLAZA in Seoul
2015 Acquired Jensen Electronics from Audiovox
