= Jensen Electronics =

Consumer electronics brand

- Type: subsidiary
- Founded: 1915
- Founder: Peter L. Jensen
- Area served: United States and Germany
- Products: Consumer and Industrial Electronics
- Owner: Dual Electronics Corporation
- Parent: Namsung
- Website: jensenmobile.com

Jensen is a consumer electronics brand with a history that dates back to 1915 with Peter L. Jensen's invention of the first loudspeaker. Over the years the Jensen family of brands has grown to include Jensen, Advent, Acoustic Research (AR), Phase Linear and NHT Loudspeakers (Now Hear This) in the United States and Magnat and Macaudio in Germany. In 2004, Audiovox Corporation added the Jensen portfolio of brands to their mobile and consumer electronics lines. In 2015, Dual Electronics Corporation (Namsung America) acquired Jensen, however Audiovox maintains its selection of Advent-branded car audio/navigation head units from its line.

In the mid 1980s through 1996, Jeep used the Jensen AccuSound premium sound system in the Jeep Cherokee (XJ) and Jeep Grand Wagoneer (SJ) vehicles, as well as in the 1993 Jeep Grand Cherokee (ZJ) and 1993 Jeep Grand Wagoneer (ZJ).

== Product lines ==
Jensen has six main product lines, all of which fit in the audio and video product categories. These lines include:

- Jensen Loudspeakers
- Jensen Mobile
- Jensen Home Electronics
- Jensen Accessories
- Jensen Specialty
- Jensen Marine
- Jensen Heavy Duty
