= Jeep Grand Cherokee (ZJ) =

American car model

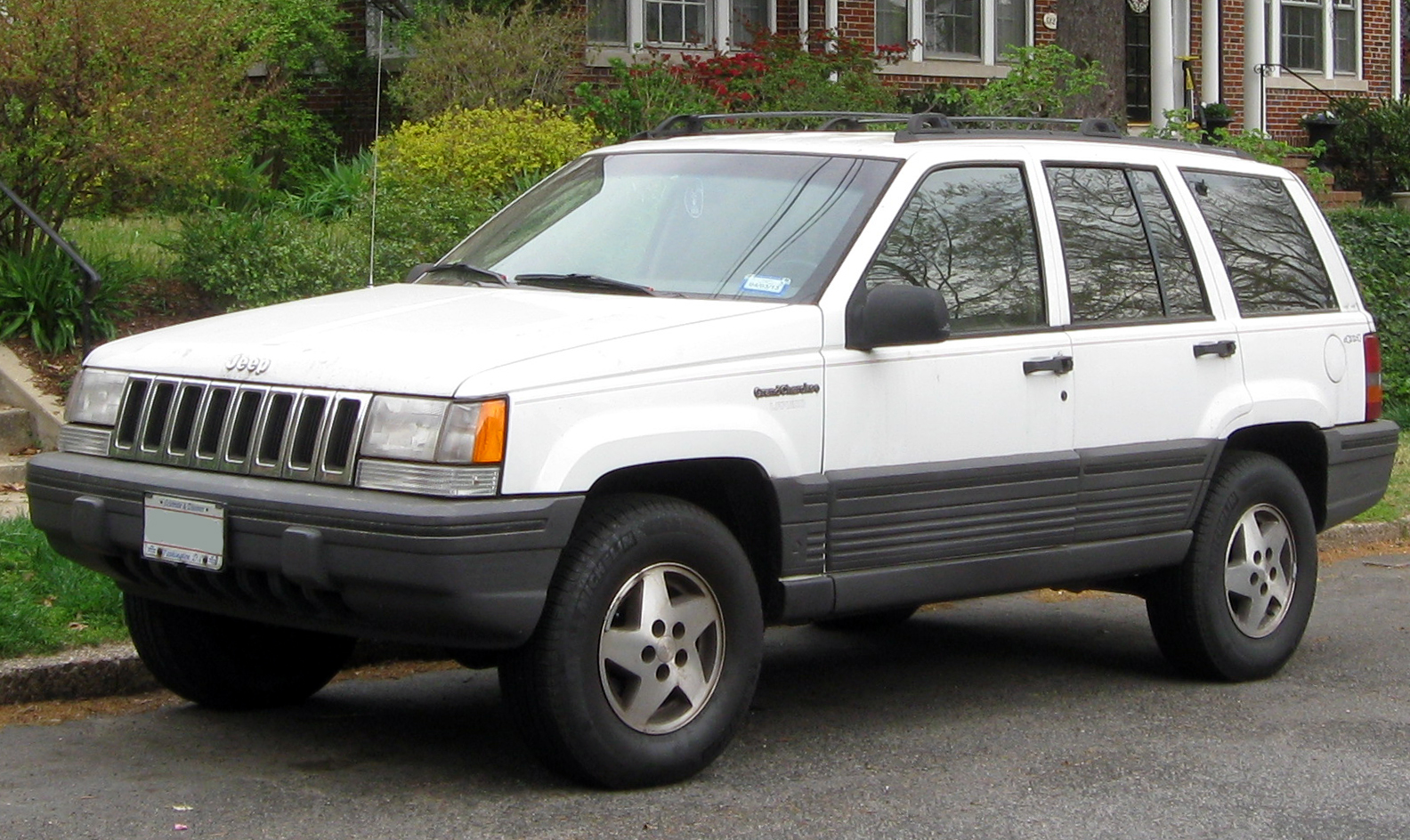
- 1993-1995 Jeep Grand Cherokee

Overview
- Manufacturer: Chrysler Corporation (1993–1998); DaimlerChrysler (1998)
- Also called: Jeep Grand Wagoneer (1992–93)
- Production: January 1992–1998
- Model years: 1993–1998
- Assembly: Detroit, Michigan, United States (Stellantis Mack Assembly Plant); Graz, Austria (Magna Steyr); Córdoba, Argentina; Valencia, Venezuela (Carabobo Assembly)
- Designer: Larry Shinoda (1985)

Body and chassis
- Layout: Front-engine, rear-wheel drive or four-wheel drive
- Platform: ZJ platform

Powertrain
- Engine: 2.5 L VM Motori 425 OHV I4 diesel Engine specs: •Displacement: 152.5 CID (2,499 cc); •Stroke: 3.701 in (94 mm); •Bore: 3.622 in (92 mm); •Power: 114 hp; •Torque: 221 ft-lb of torque; •Fuel Type: Diesel; 4.0 L AMC 242 I6 Engine specs: •Displacement: 242.1 CID (3,968 cc); •Stroke: 3.413 in (87 mm); •Bore: 3.88 in (99 mm); •Power: 190 hp; •Torque: 225 ft-lb of torque; •Fuel Type: Regular Unleaded Gasoline; 5.2 L Chrysler Magnum V8 Engine specs: •Displacement: 318 CID (5,211 cc); •Stroke: 3.31 in (84 mm); •Bore: 3.91 in (99 mm); •Power: 225 hp; •Torque: 300 ft-lb of torque; •Fuel Type: Regular Unleaded Gasoline; 5.9 L Chrysler Magnum V8 Engine specs: •Displacement: 360 CID (5,895 cc); •Stroke: 3.58 in (91 mm); •Bore: 4.00 in (102 mm); •Power: 245 hp; •Torque: 345 ft-lb of torque; •Fuel Type: Premium Unleaded Gasoline
- Transmission: 4-speed Aisin AW-4 automatic 5-speed Aisin AX-15 manual (1993-1995 4.0L); 4-speed 42RE automatic 4-speed 44RE automatic 4-speed 46RH automatic 4-speed 46RE automatic

Dimensions
- Wheelbase: 105.9 in (2,690 mm)
- Length: 1993–95: 178.7 in (4,539 mm); 1996–98: 181.2 in (4,602 mm)
- Width: 1993-95: 69.2 in (1,758 mm); 1996–98: 69.2 in (1,758 mm)
- Height: 67.3 (1709 mm)
- Curb weight: I6: 3,574 lb (1,621 kg); V8: 3,901 lb (1,769 kg)

Chronology
- Predecessor: Jeep Grand Wagoneer (SJ); Jeep Wagoneer Limited; Jeep Cherokee (SJ)
- Successor: Grand Cherokee (WJ)

The Jeep Grand Cherokee (ZJ) is the first generation of the Jeep Grand Cherokee sport utility vehicle. Introduced in 1992 for the 1993 model year, development of the ZJ Grand Cherokee began under American Motors Corporation (AMC) as a mid-sized successor to the compact Jeep Cherokee (XJ) intended to replace both it and the aging Jeep Wagoneer (SJ). The XJ version was continued after AMC was acquired by Chrysler in 1987.

Export models produced at the plant in Graz, Austria, were designated "ZG".

== Replacement for the XJ ==
During the 1980s, American Motors was exploring a follow-up to the popular entry-level Cherokee XJ model. The automaker decided to hire outside companies to develop concepts for a larger model in addition to its design department. Larry Shinoda styled a prototype in 1985. Apparently, AMC took Shinoda's design and claimed it as its own. Shinoda had to sue to get paid and get recognized for his efforts. Chrysler acquired AMC in 1987 and settled with the Shinoda estate for more than $200,000.

== Jeep Concept 1 (1989) ==
A fully operational preproduction version of the Jeep Grand Cherokee ZJ was first shown in 1989 as the "Jeep Concept 1". Featuring similar styling to the production 1993 Grand Cherokee ZJ, the Concept 1 featured a brown exterior with unique "two-tone" lower accent paint, 'Jeep' lettering on one spoke of each wheel, P295/55R17 tires, smoked headlamps and tail lamps, front bumper-mounted fog lamps, minivan-style exterior door handles, and a roof rack that was unique to the Concept 1.

== Dodge "ZJ" Concept (1990s) ==
In the early 1990s, Dodge planned a midsize replacement for the Dodge Ramcharger full-size, a truck-based SUV that had been in production since the late 1970s. An unnamed "Dodge ZJ" prototype was made that was similar in style to the 1989 Jeep Concept 1, but featured a unique front end with the Dodge "Cross-Hair" front grille, slimmer front headlamps, and unique front and rear bumpers and body side cladding. However, before the 1992 introduction of the all-new 1993 Jeep Grand Cherokee ZJ, the project was cancelled. The replacement for the Ramcharger would not arrive until the 1998 model year as the Dodge Durango, based on the midsize Dodge Dakota pickup truck.

== New Features ==
The all-new 1993 Jeep Grand Cherokee ZJ offered many new and class-exclusive features that its competitors, such as the Chevrolet S-10 Blazer and Ford Explorer, did not offer.

For example, all Jeep Grand Cherokee ZJ models featured a standard front driver's-side SRS airbag in the steering wheel. The Limited model offered a digital climate control system. All models offered a digital Electronic Vehicle Information Center (EVIC) that monitored critical vehicle systems and provided audible and visual feedback when a fault was detected (doors, hood, tailgate, engine coolant level, engine oil level, and front and rear lighting systems were some of the systems monitored by the EVIC). In addition to monitoring vehicle status, the EVIC could also display current date and time information and vehicle service interval reminders, and could be set via buttons on the EVIC screen. An overhead console provided a mini trip computer with the current direction of travel and exterior temperature information in Celsius or Fahrenheit, as well as elapsed time, mileage remaining until the fuel tank is empty, and trip mileage for two trips (Trip A and Trip B). In addition to the mini trip computer, the overhead console provided storage for a single garage door opener, two pairs of sunglasses, and included four overhead map/reading lamps. Keyless entry allowed for easy access to the vehicle without having to insert the vehicle's key into the door lock cylinder, and could also arm or disarm the class-exclusive vehicle security system. The interior lights illuminated whenever a door was opened, and could shut off automatically along with the automatic headlamps. The ignition cylinder was located on the right side of the steering column and was lighted so that it could be easily located during nighttime driving conditions. Finally, a premium AccuSound factory audio system by Jensen (or Infinity Gold on 1994 and newer models) and a 120-watt amplifier located underneath the rear bench seat could be paired with an in-dash CD player and five-band graphical equalizer for a high-fidelity audio experience.

A fully mechanical full-time four wheel drive system could split torque when a wheel was losing traction, and send all available traction to that wheel to keep moving. In addition, the system, called Quadra-Trac, could automatically detect when four wheel drive was needed, and automatically switch from rear wheel drive without input from the driver. The Grand Cherokee ZJ also offered Chrysler's 318 cubic inch (5.2 L) Magnum electronically fuel-injected V8 engine as an option, which produced 220 hp (164 kW) and 280 lb⋅ft (380 N⋅m) of torque for up to 5,000 lbs. of towing capacity, and was the only SUV in its class at the time to offer a V8 engine as an option.

In 1996, even more new features were added to the Jeep Grand Cherokee ZJ. The newly available Jeep Memory System utilized a button panel located on the inside of the front driver's door panel to recall driver's seat adjustment, mirror adjustments, and radio preset settings when the corresponding key was inserted into the ignition cylinder (each keyless entry remote was engraved with either a '1' or a '2' to designate which key would automatically recall these settings). Heated seats also became available for the front driver and passenger with slide switches located near the lighting controls on the driver's side. A power tilt-and-sliding sunroof was added to the options list, and remote controls for the audio system were added to the back of the steering wheel on some Grand Cherokee models. For the first time on the Grand Cherokee, buyers could choose a combination cassette and single-disc CD player instead of just either a cassette or a single-disc CD player. Dual front SRS airbags now came standard on all models, and the 5.2 L Magnum V8 engine gained 5 lb. ft. of torque, up to 285 from 280, and remained one of the most powerful SUVs in its class.

Finally, in 1998, the 5.9 L Limited model became available for the Jeep Grand Cherokee ZJ, utilizing Chrysler's 360 cubic inch (5.9 L) Magnum electronically fuel-injected V8 engine producing 245 horsepower and 345 lb. ft. of torque, which made the Grand Cherokee ZJ 5.9 L Limited the most powerful SUV in its class.

== Production changes ==
=== Introduction ===
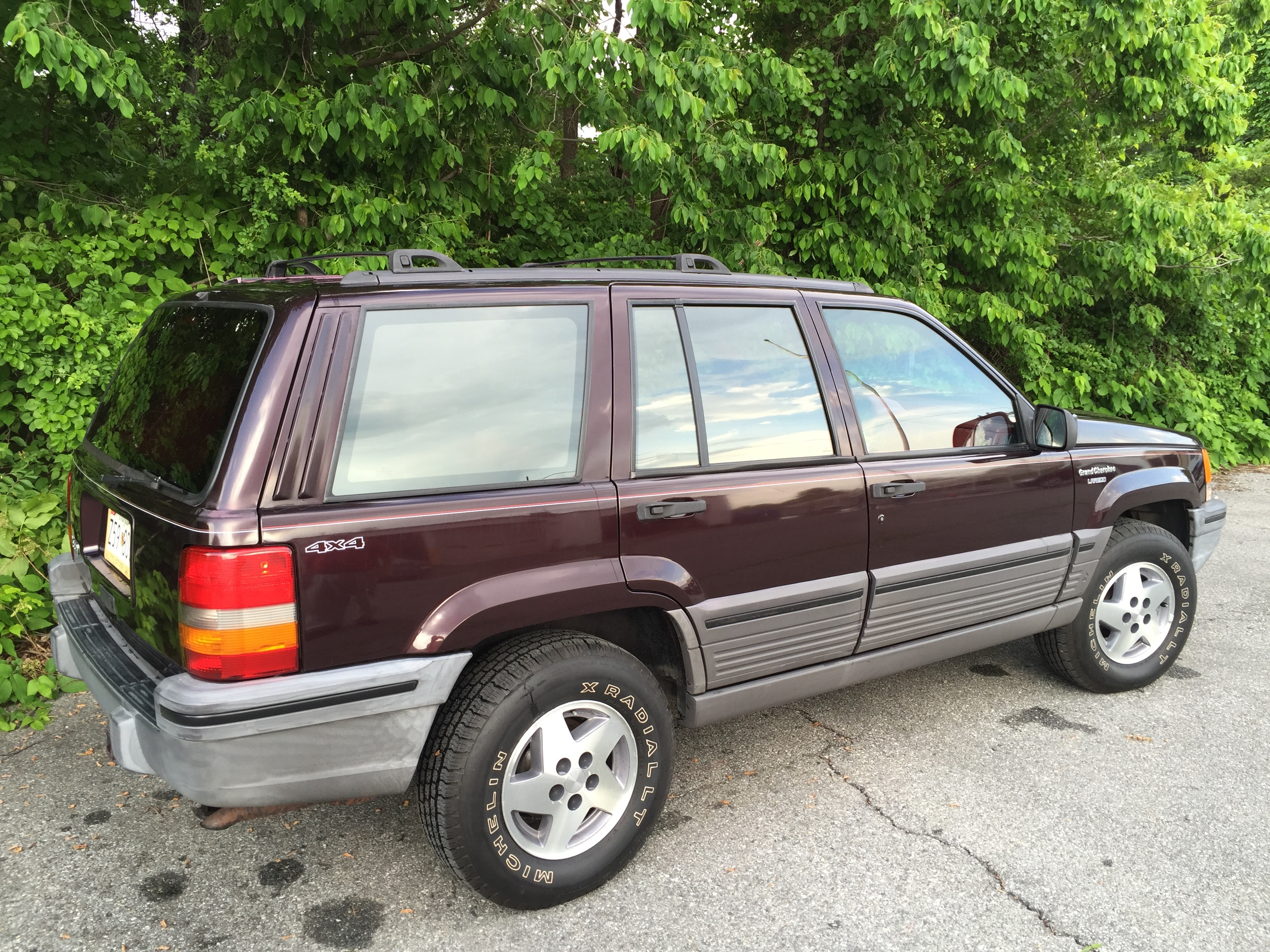
Early 1993 Jeep Grand Cherokee Laredo

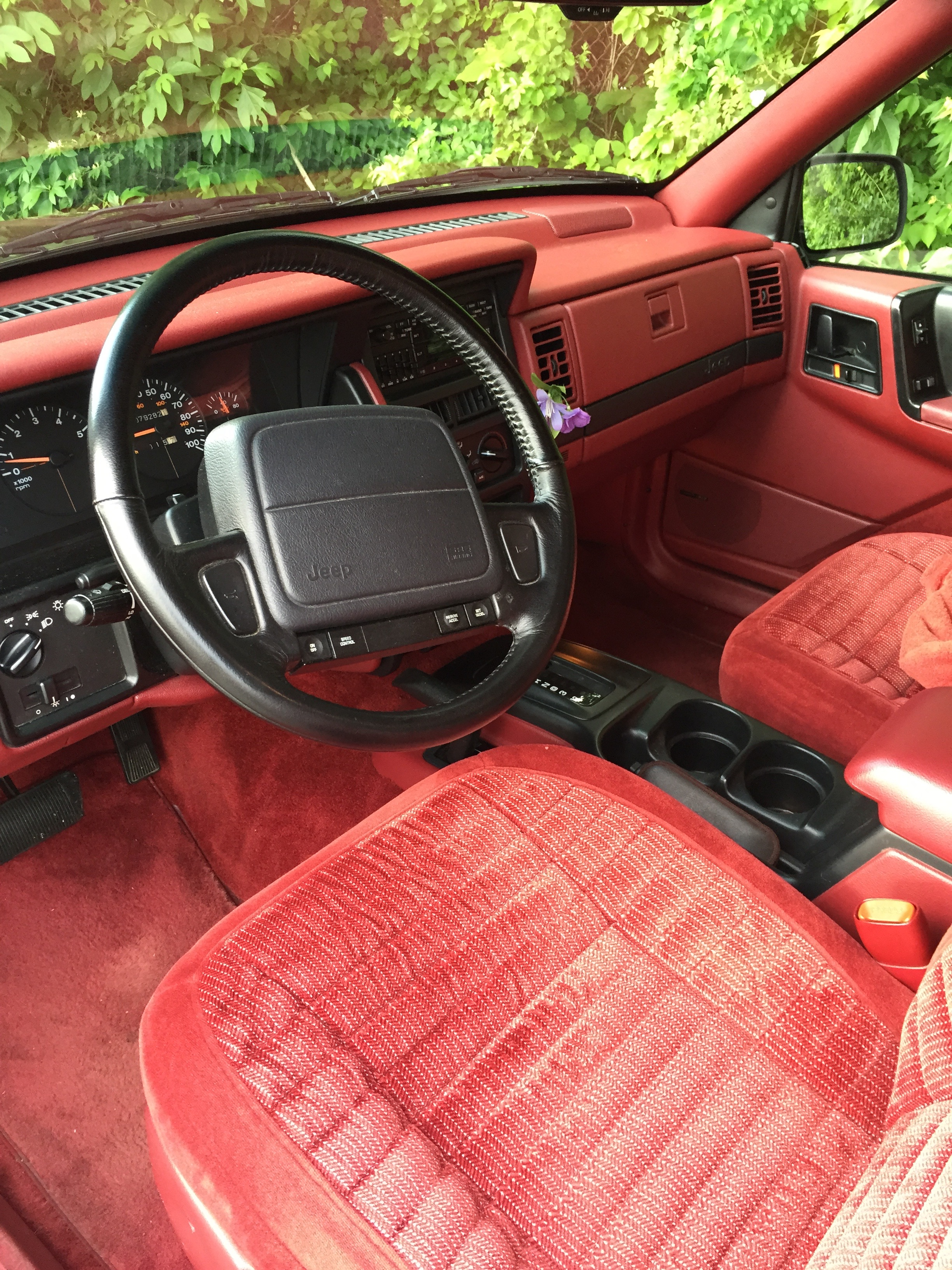
Early 1993 ZJ crimson interior

The Grand Cherokee (ZJ) was first introduced at the 1992 North American International Auto Show (NAIAS) in Detroit, Michigan. Then-CEO of Chrysler Corporation, Bob Lutz, drove a Poppy Red Clear Coat 1993 Jeep Grand Cherokee ZJ Laredo 4X4 from the Jefferson North Assembly Plant (JNAP) where the Grand Cherokee was assembled to Cobo Hall, where Lutz and then-mayor of Detroit Coleman Young drove up the front steps and into the lobby of the building, "crashing" through a plate-glass window (which "exploded" just before the vehicle's entrance).

The Grand Cherokee (ZJ) was initially available in three trim levels: base, Laredo, and Limited. The base model included features such as full instrumentation, a cloth interior, a standard five-speed manual transmission, and was given the "SE" name for the 1994 model year. Power windows and locks were not standard equipment on the base and SE models for 1993 and 1994. The minimal difference in price resulted in low consumer demand, so the low-line model was discontinued after 1994. Standard features on all models included a driver-side airbag and a four-wheel anti-lock braking system (ABS). The Laredo was the mid-scale model with standard features that included power windows, power door locks, and cruise control. Exterior features included medium-grey plastic paneling on the lower body and five-spoke aluminum wheels. The Limited was the premium model, featuring lower body paneling that was the same color as the rest of the vehicle. The Limited also had standard features such as leather seating, power sunroof, heated mirrors, heated power seats, and a remote keyless system. The "Up-Country" version was also offered between 1993 and 1997. It came with 4WD and the AMC straight-6 4.0 L engine. Package groups included: convenience, fog lamps, skid plate, lighting, luxury, power, security, and trailer towing.

When it was first introduced in April 1992 as an early 1993 model year vehicle, the Grand Cherokee had one powertrain, the AMC-derived 4.0 L Power Tech I6 engine that produced 190 horsepower. Transmission choices were a four-speed automatic transmission (early production ZJs used the AW4; the A500SE (later 42RE) replaced the AW4 during the latter half of the 1993 model year) or an Aisin AX15 manual transmission. Low sales demand for the manual transmission resulted in its discontinuation after the 1994 model year for North America, but it remained on the options list for European ZJs. The drivetrain choices included rear-wheel drive or four-wheel-drive.

=== 1993 ===
The all-new, 1993 Jeep Grand Cherokee went on sale in April 1992 in Base, Laredo, and Limited trims. At launch, all Grand Cherokees were powered by the 4.0 L Power Tech Inline Six-Cylinder engine, and were all four-wheel drive. Starting in early 1993, the Grand Cherokee became available with the 5.2 L Magnum V8 engine, and a Grand Wagoneer model became available with standard four-wheel drive and V8 power, as well as a plush leather-trimmed interior and faux vinyl woodgrain side and tailgate paneling. The 5.2 L Magnum V8 engine was available with the Quadra-Trac four-wheel drive system, which was based around an NV249 transfer case with a viscous coupler. The Quadra-Trac system was a permanent four-wheel drive system that allowed up to 60% of power to the rear wheels and a 50–50 split when loss of rear traction occurred. It also had a low range that still utilized the viscous coupler in the 1993-1995 model years. In 1996 and beyond, the low range provided a true 50-50 lock between the front and rear axles. However, the system required little to no driver input, as it was automatically determined by the viscous coupler when more front bias was required. In addition to Quadra-Trac, a Selec-Trac Full-Time four-wheel drive system was available that was a "Shift-on-the-Fly" four-wheel drive system that had a 4-wheel drive part-time mode (50/50 lock), a 4-wheel drive full-time mode (variable front bias, much like the Quadra-Trac), and a 4 LO. The standard part-time four-wheel drive system in the Grand Cherokee was known as Command-Trac, a part-time only four-wheel drive. Modes were 2 wheel drive, 4 HI, and 4 LO. All three four-wheel-drive systems featured a selector lever that was located next to the transmission gear selector or shifter. Two-wheel drive Grand Cherokees featured a small storage area in place of the four-wheel drive selector lever.

=== Late 1992/early 1993 production ===
In the late 1992/early 1993 calendar year, Chrysler made some minor changes to the 1993 model year Grand Cherokee. The changes are shown in The New Jeep, a brochure on the 1993 Jeep Grand Cherokee published in 1992. The crimson-colored interior option for the vinyl and cloth seats was no longer available, and the Limited model now had the option of quilted Highland-grain leather seats. The 5.2 L High-Output Magnum Engine V8, producing 220 horsepower, was added in early 1993. The only transmission choice was a 46RH, four-speed automatic transmission. The top-of-the-line Grand Wagoneer trim was also shown in the brochure and became available in early 1993. The radio face was changed for the AM/FM cassette player in early 1993, with raised buttons and rounded knobs, as well as larger green display text to match the rest of the Grand Cherokee's interior. The radio also introduced Dolby noise reduction technology for the cassette player. Full-faced steel wheels replaced the six-spoke version on the Base/SE model.

=== 1994 ===
For 1994, the upgraded Jensen Electronics AccuSound premium amplified audio system was rebranded Infinity Gold, with upgraded components. An AM/FM stereo with an in-dash CD player became available for the first time. Mid-level Laredo models gained standard fifteen-inch sport aluminum-alloy wheels. The Grand Wagoneer model was dropped for 1994, while the Base trim level was renamed the SE. The Aisin AW4 four-speed automatic transmission was replaced in 1994, becoming the Chrysler-built 42RE.

=== 1995 ===
In 1995, the performance of the V8 engine was upgraded to 300 lb⋅ft (407 N⋅m) from 285. The AMC 4.0 L straight-6 engine, rated to tow 5,000 lb (2,268 kg), was also refined with more torque and quieter operation.

An uplevel Orvis Edition model of the Grand Cherokee was introduced in partnership with Orvis catalog, adding features to the uplevel Limited model such as perforated tan and Moss Green leather-trimmed seating surfaces and front and rear door panels, an AM/FM stereo with in-dash CD player as an option, and unique exterior trim and fifteen-inch aluminum-alloy wheels with green inserts to the Limited trim. A flip-out rear glass hatch was a new option for the Orvis, along with font lettering which was similar to other Chrysler products (which was phased in the following model year). The base SE trim level received more standard equipment, such as power windows and door locks, Anti-lock Braking System (ABS), keyless entry, an AM/FM stereo with cassette player, air conditioning, and upgraded fifteen-inch styled steel wheels. The five-speed Aisin AX15 manual transmission was also no longer available for 1995.

=== 1996 Restyling ===
For 1996, the Grand Cherokee received a mid-cycle restyling, with new front and rear bumpers and side cladding, a larger front grille, new aluminum-alloy wheel options, and an entirely new interior, now featuring a front passenger side airbag and revised interior fabrics. A combination AM/FM stereo with cassette and CD players became available, as well as a rear-mounted multi-disc CD changer unit. The five-speed manual transmission option was also dropped for 1995. At this time, the part-time Command-Trac four-wheel drive system was dropped, leaving the full-time Selec-Trac and computerized Quadra-Trac four-wheel drive systems as options. The previous base SE trim was discontinued due to low sales, and the mid-level Laredo became the new base trim.

A new steering wheel that featured three spokes with integrated cruise control buttons, a new dual-note horn, and the horn buttons were deleted in favor of a single horn pad. The front seats were new as well as an upgraded interior with new door panels and interior trim panels, a glove box with more storage space, new tires and wheels, revised headlamps, fog lamps that were directly integrated into the vehicle's front bumper on some models, a new remote keyless system, as well as faux wood interior trim standard on all models. An optional rear lift glass (first introduced with the 1995 Orvis edition, where production tailgates manufactured after January 3, 1995, have both provisions for both fixed and lift glass) for the Laredo and Limited was added to the options list (the fixed glass came standard). The Grand Cherokee now offered standard power windows, power door locks, rear door child locks, keyless entry, AM/FM radio with cassette player and compact disc player, and four standard speakers, cloth seating surfaces, and more. The manual transmission was no longer offered after the 1994 model year Grand Cherokee sold in North America, but remained as the only transmission for European ZJs (ZG) sold in Europe with the diesel motor.

New front door designs got new side body cladding strips, and the 'Laredo' subtext on the Laredo model was moved down to the cladding. The 'Grand Cherokee' badge was relocated to the front lower doors, and was now larger (using a font style similar to other Chrysler products and initially used with the 1995 Orvis package), replacing the 1974-era American Motors font style used on Jeep vehicles. On V8-equipped Grand Cherokees, there was a new V8 badge on the rear liftgate. The 4X4 badge, on four-wheel-drive-equipped Grand Cherokees, was also changed to raised metal letters instead of the 4X4 decals offered before.

The vehicle featured an OBD II diagnostics port under the dashboard on the driver's side, required for all 1996 model year and newer vehicles, a digital odometer and trip odometer, a 120 miles per hour speedometer rating on some models, and the vehicle now included some user-programmable features such as if the headlamps and tail lamps flashed when a button was pressed on the remote keyless system, how many miles until service intervals, whether the horn sounded when a button was pressed on the remote, and more. The overhead console was somewhat redesigned for the 1996 model year to improve storage space and feature availability. In addition to the cigarette lighter port, a 12-volt power port was added for cellular telephones, coolers, computers, and other devices. The ashtray was also removed from the rear doors, replaced by a solid area. The Limited model and Orvis Edition model both got chrome interior door handles.

The 4.0 engine rating was reduced by 5 horsepower to 185 to meet EPA regulations for the 1996 model year production.

=== 1997 ===
For 1997, a new trim level of Grand Cherokee, the Special Edition, was introduced, adding the Infinity Gold premium amplified audio system, an AM/FM stereo with cassette and CD players, dual power-adjustable front bucket seats, color-keyed exterior trim, and a security system to the base Laredo model. The TSi, also based on the base Laredo model, added unique sixteen-inch sport aluminum-alloy wheels, unique front and rear bumpers and side cladding, an AM/FM stereo with cassette and CD players, dual power-adjustable front bucket seats, luxury leather-trimmed seating surfaces with dual heated front bucket seats, dark gray wood interior trim, and a security system to the Laredo trim. The 5.2 L Magnum V8 engine was now available with 2-wheel-drive (Rear-Wheel-Drive). The Orvis Edition was in its last production year for 1997, available in Moss Green and a Birch Silver exterior color.

=== 1998 ===
For 1998, the first-generation Jeep Grand Cherokee (ZJ) entered its final year of production. The Laredo and other models were carried over, and the new 5.9L Limited Edition was introduced and exclusive to this year's model.

Production of the first-generation Jeep Grand Cherokee ZJ ended in mid-1998, as production of the next generation Jeep Grand Cherokee (WJ) began at Jefferson North Assembly.

Between 1996 and 1998, the export Grand Cherokee Laredo (marketed for Japan) had the optional Aspen package (source: The Story of Jeep).

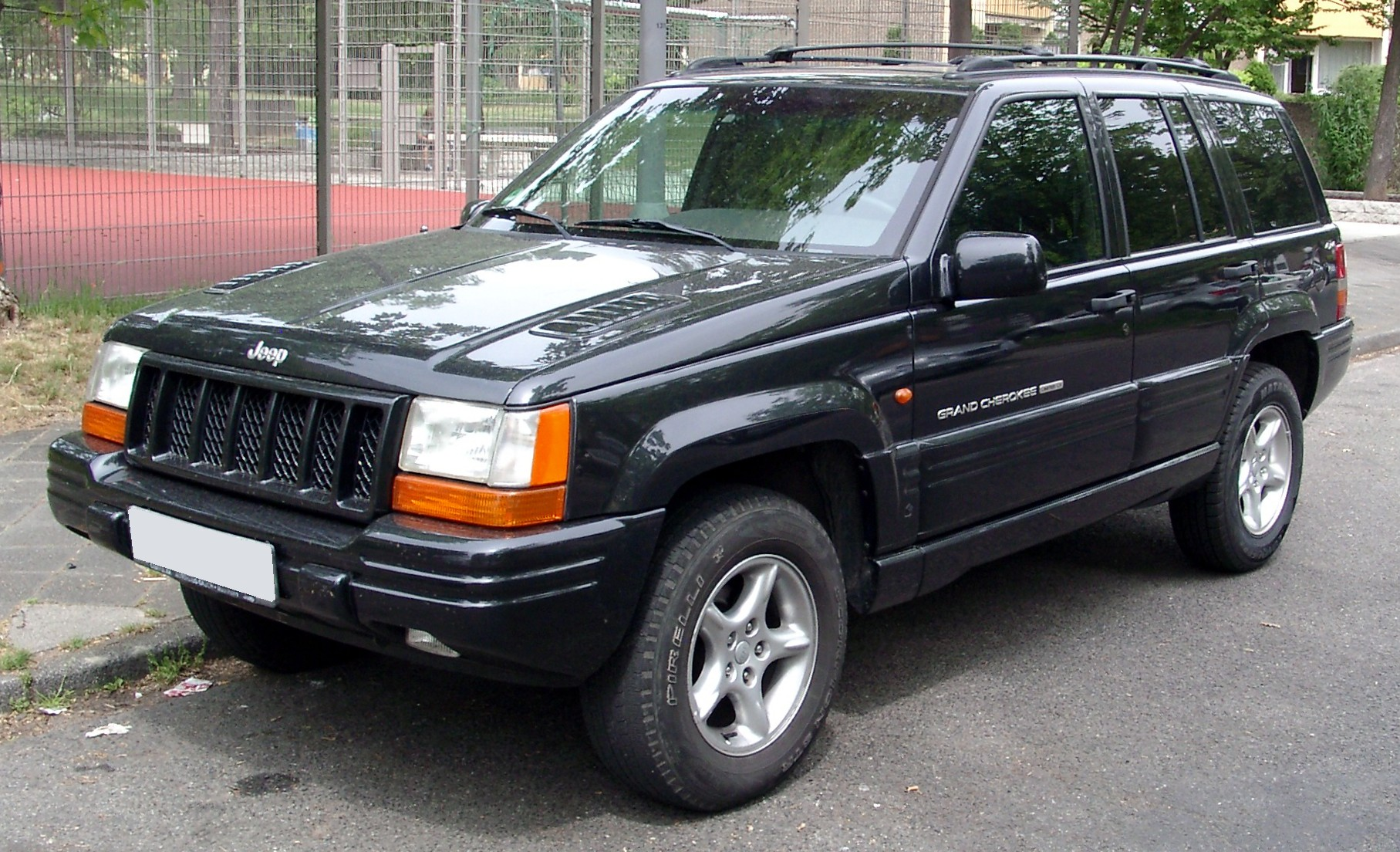
1998 5.9l Jeep Grand Cherokee, deep slate, export model

In 1998, a 5.9 L Limited model featured the 5.9 L V8 Magnum engine producing 245 hp (183 kW) with all-wheel-drive and a four-speed automatic transmission. This engine and model were only available for the 1998 model year. This Limited model featured the 5.9 L Magnum V8 engine from the Dodge Ram 1500 pickup truck, unique forged sixteen-inch aluminum-alloy wheels, unique ruffled luxury leather-trimmed seating surfaces and front and rear door panels, an AM/FM stereo with cassette and CD players, a unique ten-speaker, 180-watt Infinity Gold premium amplified audio system, a unique mesh grille and a vented performance hood to the standard Limited model. The 5.9 also included working hood vents, an upgraded alternator, and a unique exhaust. The 1998 5.9 L was the then fastest production SUV, having a measured 0-60 time (by Road and Track) of 6.8 seconds—a time that would not be beat until almost ten years later, with Jeep's SRT.

== Fleet markets ==
In the mid-late 2000s (as they passed the 15 year mark), Japanese Domestic Market (JDM) Jeep Grand Cherokees that came in right-hand drive became a popular vehicle choice for Canadian Mail Carriers since it shared the same chassis, body, suspension, and engine as the North American left-hand drive version.

== Models ==
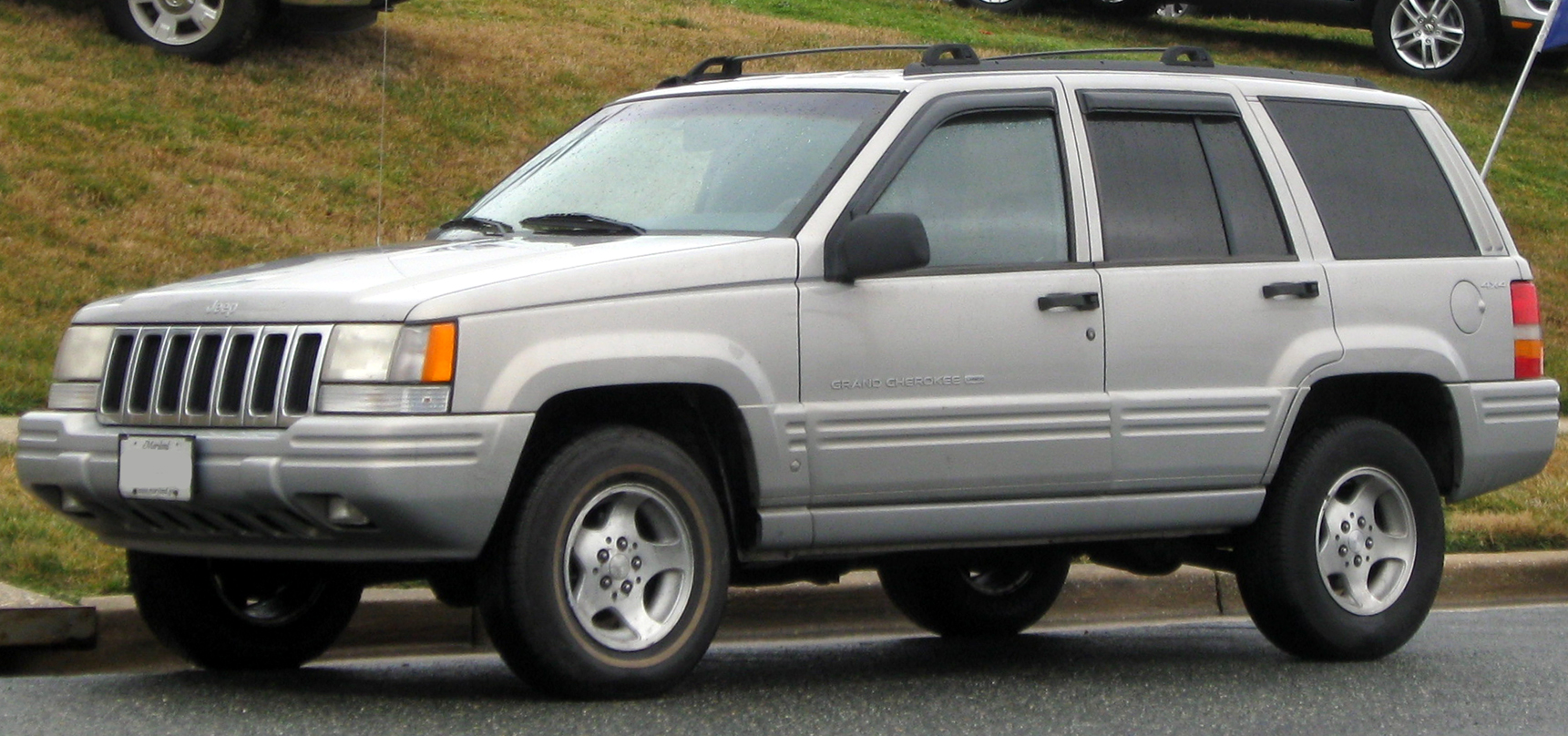
1996–1998 Jeep Grand Cherokee

The 1993-1998 Jeep Grand Cherokee ZJ was available in many distinct trim levels:

The Base and SE (1993-1995) were the most basic trim levels of the Grand Cherokee between 1993 and 1995. The Base was given a name, the SE, in 1994. Standard features included the 4.0 L "Power-Tech" I6 engine with a five-speed manual transmission, full instrumentation, vinyl-and-cloth trimmed seating surfaces, front high-back bucket seats, a split-folding rear 60/40 bench seat, an AM/FM stereo with 4 speakers, manual roll-up windows and door locks, and fifteen-inch styled steel wheels. In 1995, the SE gained standard power windows and door locks, as well as keyless entry, air conditioning, an AM/FM stereo with cassette player, warning chimes, and a four-speed automatic transmission. The SE was dropped after 1995, and in 1996, the Laredo became the base trim level of the Grand Cherokee.

The Laredo (1993-1998) served as the midrange trim level of the Grand Cherokee between 1993 and 1995, and the base trim level of the Grand Cherokee between 1996 and 1998. It added these features to the base SE Grand Cherokee: fifteen-inch (15") alloy wheels, an AM/FM stereo with cassette player, air conditioning, warning chimes, cloth seating surfaces, keyless entry, power windows and door locks, a chrome front grille, and body-side cladding and molding. In 1996, the Laredo became the base trim level of the Grand Cherokee, and it remains the base trim level to this day. In 1995, the Laredo gained a standard 4-speed automatic transmission, as the 5-speed manual transmission was dropped after 1994. Many of the features available on the luxurious Limited model could also be had on the midrange or base Laredo model.

The Laredo Special Edition (1997-1998) was slotted just above the base Laredo trim Grand Cherokee between 1997 and 1998. It added the following features to the basic Laredo trim: a premium 120-watt Infinity Gold sound system with 6 speakers, an AM/FM stereo with cassette and CD players, power front bucket seats, a security system, color-keyed body-side trim and front and rear bumpers (sourced from the Limited), a 'Special Edition' emblem on both front doors, and more.

The Limited (1993-1998) served as the "luxury" trim level of the Grand Cherokee between 1993 and 1998. It added these features to the midrange Laredo Grand Cherokee: premium leather-trimmed seating surfaces, premium low-back front bucket seats, power front seats, a premium 120-watt Infinity Gold sound system with 6 speakers, fifteen-inch (15") or sixteen-inch (16") luxury alloy wheels, a security system, 4-speed automatic transmission, an Electronic Vehicle Information Center (EVIC or VIC), carpeted floor mats, body-colored front grille, front and rear bumpers, gold-plated badging, and body-side cladding and trim, and more.

== Engines ==
Years	Displacement	Engine	Power	Torque	Notes
1995–1998	2.5 L Diesel	VM Motori 425 OHV I4	114 hp (85 kW)	221 lb·ft (300 N·m)	export
1993–1995	4.0 L (242 CID)	AMC I6	190 hp (142 kW)	225 lb⋅ft (305 N⋅m)	
1996–1998	4.0 L (242 CID)	AMC Power Tech I6	185 hp (138 kW)	220 lb⋅ft (298 N⋅m)	
1993–1998	5.2 L (318 CID)	Magnum V8	225 hp (164 kW)	300 lb·ft (407 N·m)	
1998	5.9 L (360 CID)	Magnum V8	245 hp (183 kW)	345 lb·ft (468 N·m)	Limited

== Transmissions ==
Years	Model	Engine
1993	AW4 4-speed automatic	4.0 L (242 CID)
1993-1994	Ax15 5-speed manual	4.0 L (242 CID)
1993–1998	42RE 4-speed automatic	4.0 L (242 CID)
1993–1995	46RH 4-speed automatic	5.2 L (318 CID)
1996–1998	44RE 4-speed automatic	5.2 L (318 CID)
1998	46RE 4-speed automatic	5.9 L (360 CID)

== 4x4 systems ==
Four-wheel drive systems included Command-Trac, a part-time unit offering temporary 4-wheel assistance; Command-Trac was dropped from the lineup in conjunction with the SE trim in 1996. Selec-Trac had the option of either full-time or part-time operation; both shift-on-the-fly Command-Trac and Selec-Trac were already available for the Cherokee, and they were adapted to the Grand Cherokee. Exclusive to the Grand Cherokee was the introduction of the Quadra-Trac system with permanent all-time four-wheel assistance. This was optional on all models. Low-range required using a manual shift lever for all three systems.

== Suspension ==
The Quadra-Link suspension design was used on both the front and rear axles. This design uses four control arms, two above the axle and two below it, to control longitudinal movement and rotation about the lateral axis (drive and braking reaction). A panhard rod, also referred to as a track bar, is used to locate the axle laterally. Two coil springs are seated on top of the axle housing, as well as two gas-charged shock absorbers. The optional "Up Country" package included heavier-duty German-made gas-charged shocks installed upside down, taller coil springs, and longer bump stops; thereby increasing ride height by one inch.

== Special edition ZJs ==
There were several different "one-off" and special edition models of the ZJ.

=== Grand Wagoneer (1993) ===
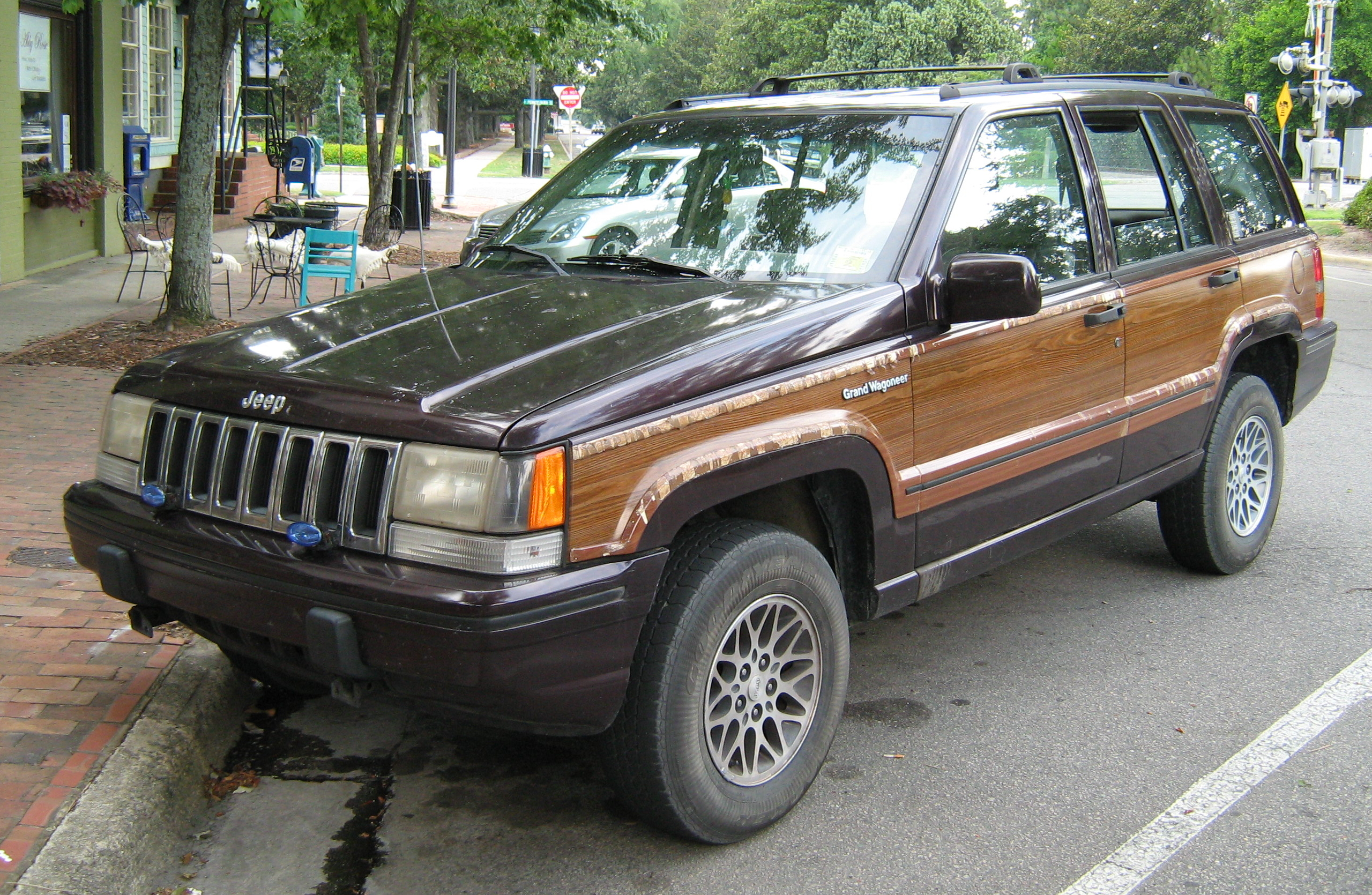
1993 Jeep Grand Wagoneer

Following the introduction of the all-new 1993 Grand Cherokee ZJ, Jeep introduced an "ultra-luxury" model of its all-new midsize SUV, called the Grand Wagoneer. Based on the Grand Cherokee Limited and paying tribute to the Jeep Grand Wagoneer SJ of which the Grand Cherokee ZJ replaced, the Grand Wagoneer included a standard 5.2L "Magnum" High-Output V8 engine and the new "Quadra-Trac" full-time four wheel drive (4X4) system, both of which were optional on all other Grand Cherokees. Additional features on top of the Limited included exclusive faux woodgrain vinyl decals on the front fenders, doors, and rear tailgate, chrome Grand Wagoneer emblems on both front fenders, deletion of the lower textured body side cladding, unique pinstripes on the front and rear bumpers and above the woodgrain decals on both sides of the vehicle, color-keyed heated power-adjustable side mirrors, a chrome front grille, front bumper-mounted driving (fog) lamps, a color-keyed leather-wrapped tilt steering wheel with cruise control, ultra-luxury quilted leather-trimmed seating surfaces, a security system, and a full-size, matching cargo area-mounted spare tire and wheel with vinyl cover. The Grand Wagoneer was available in several different exterior color options, although all interiors were beige in color, regardless of exterior color. Options were very limited, as the Grand Wagoneer had a long list of standard equipment, although an A/M-F/M radio with a graphic equalizer and a single-disc CD player was available as an option (the Grand Cherokee ZJ was one of the first midsize SUVs to offer a factory-installed, in-dash CD player as an option). As there was not a large market for the Grand Cherokee ZJ-based Grand Wagoneer, it was discontinued after the 1993 model year, once again leaving the Limited as the top-of-the-line Grand Cherokee trim level.

=== Orvis Edition (1995–1997) ===
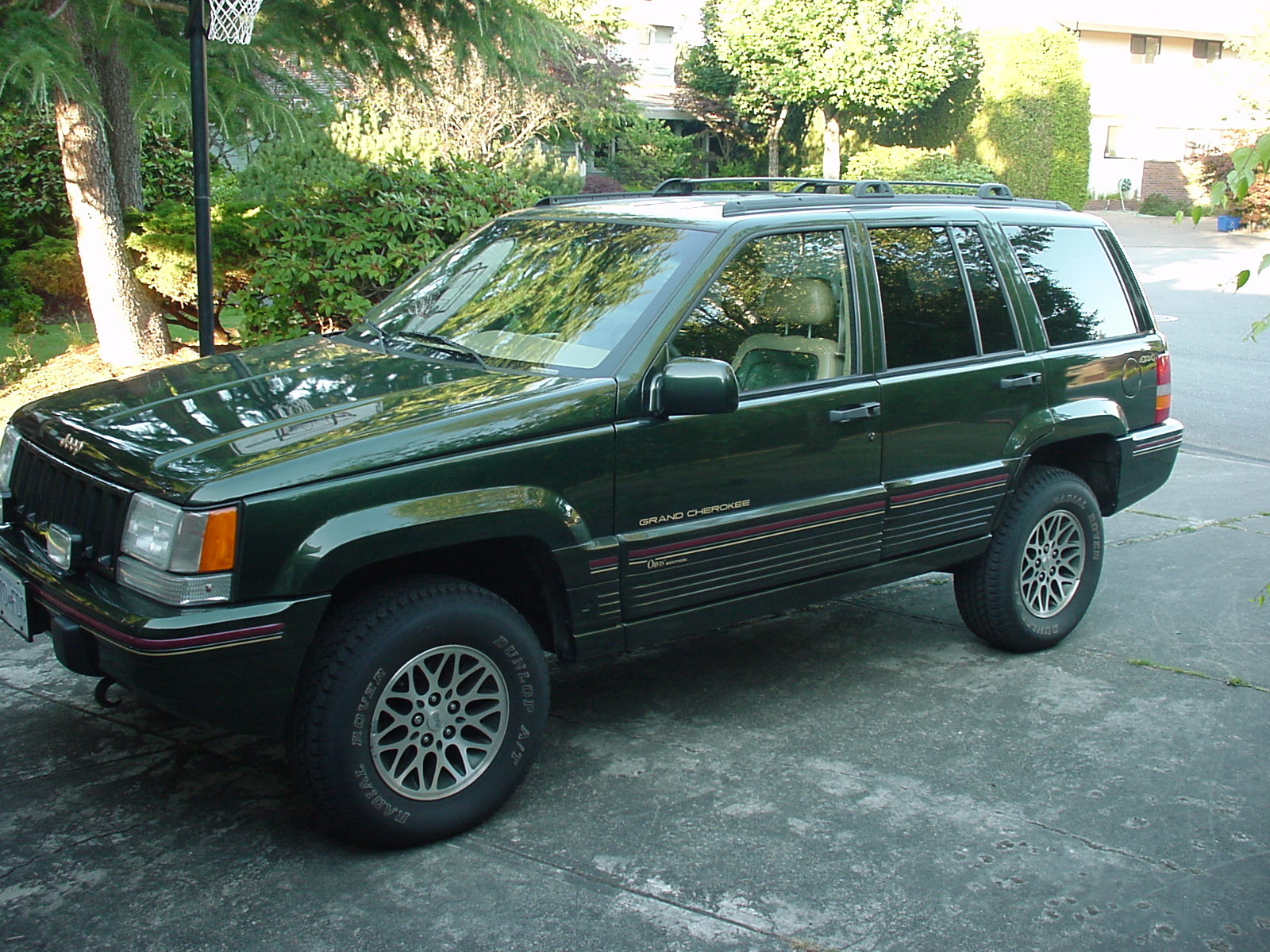
1995 Grand Cherokee Orvis Edition

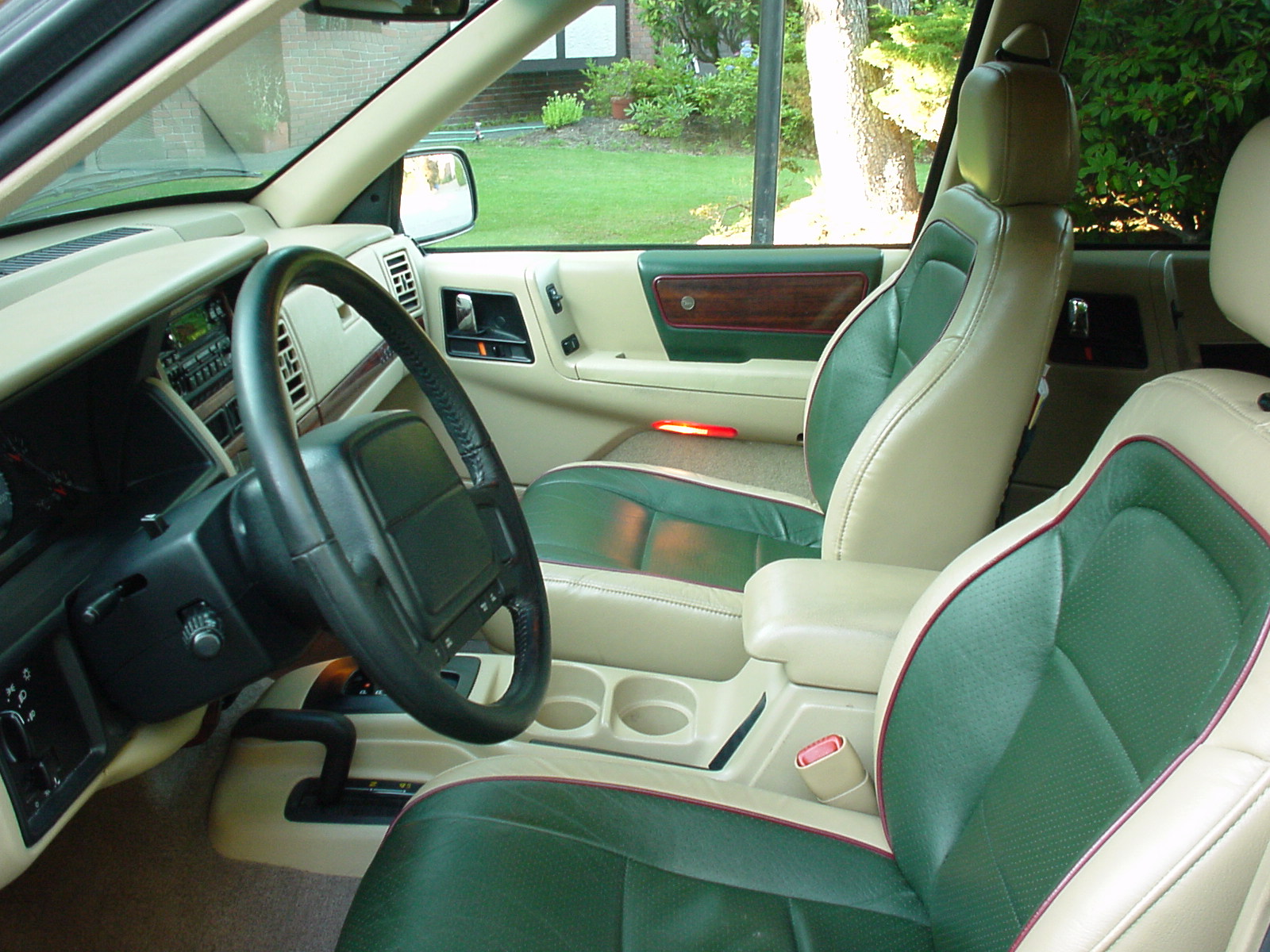
1995 Grand Cherokee Orvis Edition interior

The Orvis (1995–1997) was a Grand Cherokee Limited package that featured an exterior color scheme of Moss Green, or in 1997 the (less common) Light Driftwood, with roan red and maize side strip accents (1995). Moss Green paint accents on the road wheels (matching the moss green body color) and the special "Orvis" brand badging were the only significant exterior visual differences. In performance, the 5.2 V8 engine became standard, but was available with a 4.0 L I6 engine. Also, some Orvis editions came with a rear liftglass (which in 1996 became a mainstream option), tow hooks, and the Up-Country suspension group. However, the interior was special. Two-tone green and tan leather seats were complemented with roan red accent piping and Orvis insignia. There was a slight difference between the 1996 and 1997 interiors compared to each other. The 1996 had a black dash, whereas the 1997 had a tan dash. The Orvis Edition luxury trim package was optional on the Limited version, and when equipped with all the other options, was the most expensive of all the Grand Cherokee versions until 1998 when the 5.9 Limited was introduced. Jeep ended its relationship with Orvis Catalog in 1997, and the Orvis Edition was discontinued. However, in Europe, the ZJ (ZG) Orvis Special Edition in RHD form has now become the ultimate. Boasting all the Orvis extras, plus features such as Bonnet (Hood) vents from the 5.9, this exclusively high output 4.0 6 cylinder (195 bhp) 3:73 standard gearing car was offered in Platinum Mist Metallic with Black Leather and wood trim, complete with an Option Free list (except Tow Pack), 0-60 of 8.1, and a factory top speed of 132 mph.

Production numbers of the Orvis Editions are:

- 1995: 10,020
- 1996: 2,341
- 1997: 2,733

(Note - European (ZG) 4.0 HO model Orvis - estimated at a couple of hundred in RHD).

=== TSi (1997–1998) ===
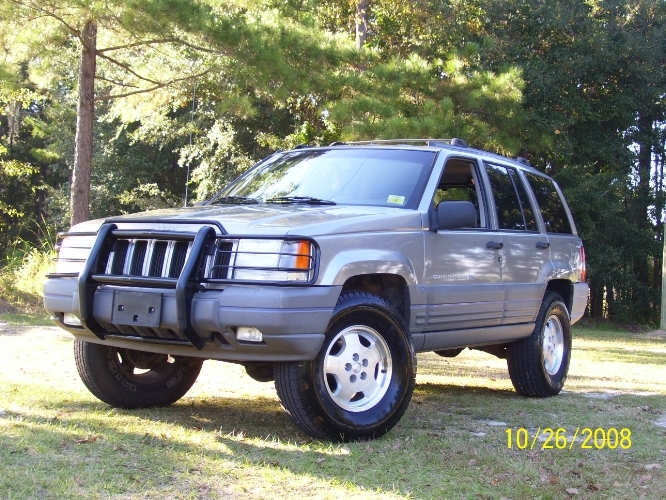
1998 Grand Cherokee TSi

A sporty TSi model (1997–1998) was briefly offered, with exterior features that included single-color body paneling with lower indigo blue striping, a body-colored grille, and TSi accents. The TSi trim level was first used on the turbocharged, intercooled version of the 1986-89 Chrysler Conquest before it transferred to Eagle and was applied to performance-oriented 1990-98 Talons and 1993-97 Visions from Jeep's sister brand. The TSi trim was applied to the Grand Cherokee to create a stronger connection between Jeep and Eagle, as Eagle sales had been in the doldrums by 1997.

The TSi could only be ordered in select colors, which included Black, Platinum, and Deep Amethyst. TSi packages came equipped with five-spoke 16-inch (410 mm) alloy wheels, 225/70R16 Goodyear Eagle GA tires, fog lights, Luxury group, featuring: "Highland" perforated, power, leather seats, overhead computer, and a premium sound system with steering wheel mounted controls. Contrary to popular belief, the suspension used on the TSi was the standard duty Quadra-Coil suspension used on all non-UpCountry ZJs. Both the 4.0 I6 and the 5.2 V8 were available. Quadra-Trac was standard with the TSi package for both engines, while Selec-Trac was optional with the I6. Both engine options could also be special-ordered in 2-wheel drive configurations. The TSi was priced between the Laredo and the Limited and was discontinued after a two-year run.

=== 5.9 Limited (1998) ===
The 5.9 Limited was produced only for the 1998 model year, having more luxury and performance than that of the regular Limited. Chrysler manufactured nearly a quarter million Grand Cherokees in 1998. Of those, fewer than fifteen thousand were 5.9s. Standard was a Magnum 5.9 L V8 engine producing 245 hp (183 kW) and 345 lb⋅ft (468 N⋅m) of torque and capable of accelerating from zero to 60 mph (97 km/h) in 6.8 seconds, making it the quickest SUV available that year (that time was not bested until almost ten years later, when Jeep introduced the SRT). Because of this, unlike other Grand Cherokee models, the 5.9 Limited required premium unleaded gasoline. The 5.9 Jeep Grand Cherokee was named the 1998 four-wheel drive vehicle of the year by Petersen's 4-Wheel & Off-Road magazine.

The 5.9 Limited was available only in Deep Slate, Stone White, and Bright Platinum. European version named 5.9 Limited LX and had two additional colors: Forest Green and Deep Amethyst.

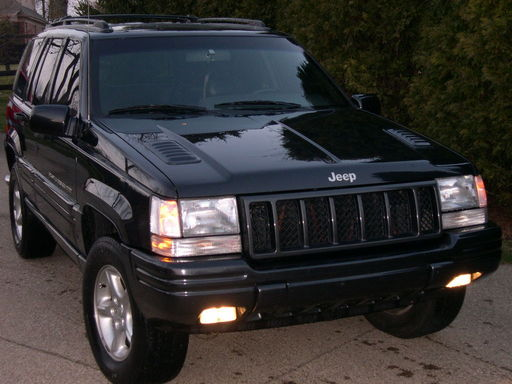
A Deep Slate 1998 Grand Cherokee 5.9 L with unique hood louvers and mesh grille inserts

The 5.9 Jeep Grand Cherokee included unique features. These included all the options from the Limited and the following:

- a higher output alternator
- Low-profile roof rack (used on the next generation)
- Unique wood grain accents
- Calf's leather interior
- Chrome exhaust tip
- Unique front grille
- Unique side rocker moldings
- Functional heat-extracting hood louvers
- Leather armrest in rear seating position
- 6-channel Infinity premium stereo (includes rear door subwoofers and cargo area soundbar)
- Leather-wrapped shifter and emergency brake handles
- Unique leather door inserts, armrests, and console lid
- Unique five-star wheels
- 46RE 4-speed automatic transmission
- 3.73 differential gearing with rear Trac-Lok
- Requires premium gasoline

=== Safety ===
==== Insurance Institute for Highway Safety (IIHS) ====
1996-1998 Grand Cherokee IIHS scores
Moderate overlap frontal offset	Marginal
Small overlap frontal offset	Not Tested
Side impact	Not Tested
Roof strength	Not Tested

==== NHTSA ====
1993-1998 Grand Cherokee NHTSA scores
Frontal Driver (1993-1995):	4/5 stars
Frontal Driver (1996-1998):	3/5 stars
Frontal Passenger (1993-1995, 1998):	3/5 stars
Frontal Passenger (1996-1997):	4/5 stars

== Awards ==
- The Grand Cherokee V8 was on Car and Driver magazine's Ten Best list and was Motor Trend magazine's Truck of the Year for 1993.
- It was also Petersen's 4x4 of the Year in 1993, 1996 (with the redesigned NV249 transfer case), and 1998 (with the newly available 5.9 L V8).
- The Grand Cherokee V8 received many awards from smaller enterprises, newspapers, and blogs such as Best Vehicle of the Year from the Asheville Chronicle 1996–2000, Beta Blog's Best Family 4X4 1995–1998, and "Best 4x4" from Bearded Monthly.

== 2017 Jeep Grand One Concept ==
Jeep introduced several concept vehicles for its annual Easter Safari in Moab, Utah. One such vehicle was the Jeep Grand One, which was created to celebrate the 25th anniversary of the Jeep Grand Cherokee. This vehicle was based on a stock Stone White 1993 Jeep Grand Cherokee ZJ Laredo 4X4 equipped with the 5.2 L Magnum High-Output V8 engine and 46RH 4-speed automatic transmission, which the automaker purchased off of Craigslist specifically for the project. The Grand One was repainted a robin's-egg blue with a light woodgrain-style treatment underneath the paint, paying homage to the 1993 Jeep Grand Wagoneer ZJ, and the wheelbase was stretched to accommodate new front and rear axles (however, this is only noticeable if one looks at the slightly modified rear doors that had to be modified to accommodate the longer wheelbase). Large front and rear fender flares conceal the extended wheelbase. The Grand One also receives large, off-road capable tires, custom eighteen-inch laced aluminum-alloy wheels, a slight lift, an eight-slot gloss black-finished front grille, 2017 Jeep Grand Cherokee-style 'GRAND CHEROKEE' emblems on the front doors and rear tailgate, and a new '5.2' emblem on the rear tailgate. Pinstripes on the side and rear of the body were removed, as was the textured side cladding, and the 'Jeep' emblem on the hood. Underneath the Grand One's hood, all components are stock Jeep except for a Mopar air filter and intake. Inside, the interior of the Grand One is mostly stock, except for new upholstery (the stock seats of the Grand One were re-wrapped in a modern gray leather-and-microfiber-suede with bright blue accent stitching) and a plaid headliner. Retro touches, such as the factory AM/FM radio with a cassette player that has a cassette tape sticking out of the tape deck, an Audiovox car phone, and an original Nintendo Game Boy on the rear seat are eminent on the Grand One, paying tribute to the Jeep Grand Cherokee's history.
