= Social.fm =

Social networking service

social.fm.
- Website type: Social Network
- Owner: Srivats Sampath
- Creator: Srivats Sampath
- Launched: 2003; 23 years ago
- Current status: defunct since August 4, 2008; 18 years ago

Social.FM was a free social networking service for music fans. It was run by Mercora and was shut down in August 2008. Social.FM allowed Internet users to search and listen to a digital radio network of over three million songs, express their musical identity via a customizable profile page, and webcast music to other Social.FM users.

Social.FM's mission was to catalogue and organize the world's music and make it universally searchable and legally listenable. Social.FM's catalogue contained over three million unique songs by over 200,000 individual artists across all music genres. The songs were available only through streaming media, and were free.

== Company history ==
Social.FM (at the time known as Mercora) was co-founded in 2003 by Srivats Sampath. Before founding Social.FM, Sampath was the co-founder and president of McAfee.com, vice-president of server product marketing at Netscape, and president and CEO of Discussions Corporation.

== How Social.FM worked ==
To listen to music, a user could search the Social.FM network via a web browser and click a song link. Alternatively, a Social.FM user could download a free software client that webcasts music from his personal music collection to other Social.FM users worldwide.

=== Musical self-expression and discovery ===
Social.FM allowed music lovers to express their musical identity to others via a customizable profile page. Users could create musical profiles, upload digital pictures, and listen to and webcast their favorite artists.

A Social.FM user could discover new music by viewing recent searches, listening to webcasts, exploring mixes, or browsing the profiles and collections of other Social.FM users. A user could also search for artist biographies, discographies, reviews, images, and podcasts. Social.FM users could also communicate and share their musical tastes via charts, messaging, and chat.

=== Social.FM Mobile ===
The Social.FM Mobile music service provided users with Wireless access to the Social.FM network. Social.FM users could search and listen to a digital radio network of over three million unique songs and 200,000 individual artists. Social.FM Mobile also provided:

- 100,000 channels of digital radio
- Over-the-air access to the music library on the PC
- Access to friends' music collections
- Streaming podcasts from leading media services
- Stereo Bluetooth support via A2DP profiles

Social.FM Mobile offered support for any Windows Mobile 5.0-based Smartphone or Pocket PC phone with Wi-Fi, GSM or GPRS (3G) connectivity. Windows Mobile 5.0-certified devices include the Motorola Q, Palm Treo 700w and Smartphone and Pocket PC phones by Hewlett-Packard, HTC, i-mate, Siemens, Samsung and Audiovox.

=== IM Artist Program ===
The Social.FM IM Artist Program was intended for independent artists and bands that want to increase promotion and publicity for their music. As members of the IM Artist Program, participating artists received:

- Five music channels webcasting to social.fm users worldwide
- A "Now Playing" profile with artist pictures, biography, and discography
- Website links to purchase CDs, merchandise, tickets, and more
- The ability to communicate with fans and listeners via artist forums and chat

The IM Artist program was in beta and free.

=== Social.FM Madwords ===
Social.FM Madwords was a contextual advertising system that enabled advertisers to target text placements by artist or music genre. The text placements were displayed in the "Sponsored Links" section of a webpage upon a search for artist or genre (such as "Coldplay" or "Alternative"). In some ways, this system was similar to Adwords (later Google Ads).

Madwords enabled advertisers to sign up directly via a credit card and was priced on a pay per click (PPC) basis. Advertisers could create and upload their text ads, select their targeting criteria, set their budget and PPCs, and view statistics and reports via a password-protected webpage.

=== Search boxes ===
Social.FM search boxes enabled consumers to search and listen to music from websites and blogs. Website and blog operators could customize the search box to incorporate their desired color scheme, size, logo, and preferred artists. Consumers could search for artists and listen through a separate browser window.

=== Music iFrames ===
Social.FM Music iFrames enabled consumers to view a subset of songs available from a particular artist and click a song to listen. The list of songs was dynamically generated and updated every 60 seconds. There was also a 'more' option if the consumer desired to listen to a song that was not currently displayed within the Music iFrame. Clicking the 'more' button displayed a full list of songs available from a particular artist.

Similar to Social.FM search boxes, website and blog operators could customize the Music iFrame to incorporate their desired color scheme, size, logo, and preferred artists.

== System requirements ==
Social.FM required Windows 2000/XP/2003 Server and a broadband Internet connection. To support webcasting, audio files must be in Vorbis, MP3, or WMA formats. In 2006, Social.FM expected to migrate to a browser-based model which would enable support for the Mac and Linux platforms.

== See also ==
- AOL Radio, a similar service by Time-Warner.
- LAUNCHcast, a similar service by Yahoo! Music.
- MySpace, a social network by News Corporation.
- Last.FM, a similar service by CBS Corporation.

== Press ==
- "Social.FM is dead". VentureBeat. August 4, 2008.
- Social.FM, NME Ink Radio Deal, MP3.com, April 26, 2006
- Tiscali Partners with Social.FM to Launch Tiscali Free Jukebox, TransWorldNews, April 26, 2006
- Mercora IMRadio for Google Talk, PC Magazine, November 14, 2005

== Awards ==
- AlwaysOn OnHollywood 100 Award
- AlwaysOn Media 100 Award
- 2006 DEMOfall Award
- TIME.com 50 Coolest Websites for 2005
