= Acoustic Research =

Audio equipment company in Massachusetts, US

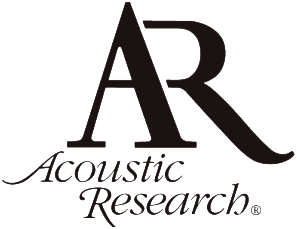
- Company type: Private
- Industry: Consumer electronics
- Founded: 1954; 72 years ago
- Founder: Edgar Villchur; Henry Kloss
- Headquarters: Cambridge, Massachusetts, United States
- Products: systems
- Owner: VOXX
- Website: http://www.acoustic-research.com

Acoustic Research was a Cambridge, Massachusetts-based company that manufactured high-end audio equipment. The brand is now owned by VOXX. Acoustic Research was known for the AR-3 series of speaker systems, which used the 12 in (300 mm) acoustic suspension woofer of the AR-1 with newly designed dome mid-range speaker and high-frequency drivers. AR's line of acoustic suspension speakers were the first loudspeakers with relatively flat response, extended bass, wide dispersion, small size, and reasonable cost. The AR Turntable remains a highly sought vinyl record player.

== Company history ==
Acoustic Research, Inc. ("AR") was founded in 1954 by audio pioneer, writer, inventor, researcher and audio-electronics teacher Edgar Villchur and his student, Henry Kloss. AR was established to produce the US$185 (equivalent to $2,190 in 2025) model AR-1, a loudspeaker design incorporating the acoustic suspension principle based on U.S. patent 2,775,309, granted to Edgar Villchur and assigned to Acoustic Research in 1956.

Edgar Villchur's technical innovation was based on objective testing and research, most of which was made publicly available as documents, specifications, and measurements—all of which were then new in the loudspeaker industry. Acoustic Research, as an employer, claimed equal opportunity and offered liberal employee benefits, insurance, and profit sharing to its employees.

=== Acoustic suspension loudspeaker ===
The acoustic suspension woofer provided an elegant solution to the age-old problem of bass distortion in loudspeakers caused by non-linear, mechanical suspensions in conventional loudspeakers. The existing state-of-the-art at the time of AR's invention was the bass reflex speaker, which boosted bass response for a given amount of cone travel by directing sound energy from the rear of the speaker cone through a port in the cabinet "tuned" for reinforcement of the direct signal from the front of the cone by the signal from the rear of the cone. Among the drawbacks of bass reflex design are the stringent design parameters required for accurate bass reinforcement, requiring high precision and, at the time, large cabinets. Some loss of accuracy ("smearing" or "vooming" of low frequencies) was inevitable, and the results were not entirely predictable. Extensive prototyping drove up the development costs of new designs, pushing them out of popular price ranges. High-fidelity woofers were vulnerable to damage from extreme low-frequency signals. Those issues were addressed with the invention of the acoustic suspension woofer.

The acoustic suspension woofer (sometimes known as "air suspension") used the elasticity of air within a small, sealed enclosure of about 1.7 cu ft (48 L) to provide the restoring force for the woofer cone. The entrapped air of the sealed-loudspeaker enclosure, unlike the mechanical springs of conventional speakers, provided an almost linear spring for the woofer's diaphragm, enabling it to move back and forth large distances ("excursion") in a linear fashion, a requirement for the reproduction of deep bass tones. The disadvantage of this arrangement is low efficiency. Since the restoring force is large with a large woofer in a small cabinet, the cone must be massive to keep the resonant frequency in the required low bass region. The AR-1s were about 10 percent as efficient as other (physically much larger) existing speakers with equivalent bass response, but since higher power amplifiers were becoming available about the same time, this was a reasonable trade-off to get good bass response from a relatively small speaker.

The AR-1 set new standards for low-frequency performance and low distortion that were unsurpassed for many years. Some of the best loudspeakers available fifty years later continue to use the acoustic suspension principle for high-quality, low-distortion bass reproduction. The small size of the high-performance AR-1 permitted by the acoustic suspension design helped usher in the age of stereophonic sound reproduction. Two bookshelf-sized loudspeakers were far more acceptable in a living room than the two refrigerator-sized boxes previously necessary to reproduce low-frequency bass notes.

By March 1957, AR began shipping a smaller, less expensive acoustic suspension system, the US$87 (equivalent to $1,030 in 2025) Model AR-2. The AR-2 was selected by Consumer Reports as a "Best Buy," and the company's sales went from $383,000 in 1956 to nearly $1,000,000 by the end of 1957. Also that year, co-founder and Vice President Henry Kloss left AR to form a new loudspeaker company, KLH.

== AR-3 loudspeaker ==
In 1958, AR once again pioneered loudspeaker technology with the introduction of the landmark model AR-3. This model used the AR-1's acoustic-suspension woofer in conjunction with the first commercially available hemispherical ("dome") mid-frequency midrange unit (squawker) and high-frequency tweeter.

For nearly ten years after its introduction, the AR-3 was widely regarded as the most accurate loudspeaker available at any cost, and was used in many professional installations, recording studios, and concert halls. Many professional musicians used AR-3 loudspeakers as monitors because of their excellent sound reproduction. In the early 1960s, AR conducted a series of over 75 live vs. recorded demonstrations throughout the United States in which the sound of a live string quartet was alternated with echo-free recorded music played through a pair of AR-3s. In this "ultimate" subjective test of audio quality, the listeners were largely unable to detect the switch from live to recorded, a strong testament to Acoustic Research's audio quality.

The company also established music demonstration rooms on the mezzanine of Grand Central Terminal in New York City and on a street corner of Harvard Square in Cambridge, Massachusetts, where the public could stop by and listen to its products, but no sales were made there. This low-key marketing innovation boosted the company's business.

AR continued to introduce new designs, and by 1966 the company had grown to hold 32.2% of the US domestic loudspeaker market, based on the IHFM and High Fidelity surveys statistics for that year. This was the largest market share ever held by a loudspeaker manufacturer since statistics have been kept.

The AR-3 was replaced by the AR-3a in 1969, having a new dome midrange and tweeter which were reduced in dimensions, for even better mid- and high-frequency dispersion. On September 13, 1993, an AR-3 was placed on permanent display in the Information Age exhibit of National Museum of American History at The Smithsonian Institution in Washington, DC.

The AR-3a was subsequently replaced by the AR-11 and AR-10pi in 1977, which shared the same improved tweeter and midrange domes. The 10pi had woofer/bass response adjustment switches to allow for a variety of room placements. The new tweeter used in the AR-11/10pi had a brighter high-frequency response, partly to compensate for reduced dispersion compared to the tweeter of the AR3a.

== Turntables ==
AR produced a low-cost ($68 in 1963, equivalent to $715 in 2025) XA manual belt-drive turntable, a type of phonograph, using a cast aluminum 3.3 lb (1.5 kg) turntable platter suspended with a T-bar sub-chassis that greatly reduced acoustic feedback. A 24-pole hysteresis-synchronous, permanent magnet Hurst AC motor propelled the platter via a precision ground rubber belt to produce very low wow and flutter, exceeding the NAB (National Association of Broadcasters) standards for turntable measurements.

Many AR turntable models remain in high demand. In particular, the mid-1980s models are highly modifiable to become first-rate vinyl record playback units.

== Teledyne buyout ==
In 1967, Acoustic Research was bought by Teledyne, Inc., and for the next 22 years, it continued development and operations in Cambridge as Teledyne Acoustic Research. Technological breakthroughs during this period included a high-current amplifier. When purchased by Teledyne, AR was the world's second-largest supplier of branded loudspeakers. Although Acoustic Research continued product development, by 1989, AR had dropped to fifth place worldwide, and Teledyne sold the company to their major competitor, Jensen Electronics. In 1996, Jensen, including AR, was sold to Recoton Audio Corporation.

Under both Jensen and Recoton, the AR brand continued development in the speaker industry, including the environmental controls that allowed a speaker to be placed in different room areas, the Acoustic Blanket that minimized diffraction and interference in speaker baffles, and a speaker line designed to complement home theater and the digital technologies of the 1990s.

In 2003, Audiovox (now Voxx International) acquired Recoton's US audio operations and continues developing and selling AR-brand speakers. An associated firm, AB Tech Services, provided maintenance of AR speakers until mid-2014. Web-based audiophile communities lamented the company's closure and apparent liquidation of parts stock. As of July 2014, CM Tech Support assumed responsibility for Acoustic Research parts and services.
