= Nakhon Suvarnabhumi Province =

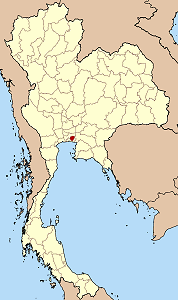
Map of Thailand highlighting the location of the proposed province

Nakhon Suvarnabhumi (Thai: นครสุวรรณภูมิ) was a proposed new province of Thailand in southeast Bangkok around Suvarnabhumi Airport. It was planned to include the districts Lat Krabang and Prawet of Bangkok and Bang Sao Thong and Bang Phli of Samut Prakan Province, an area of 521 km^{2} with about 462,000 residents.

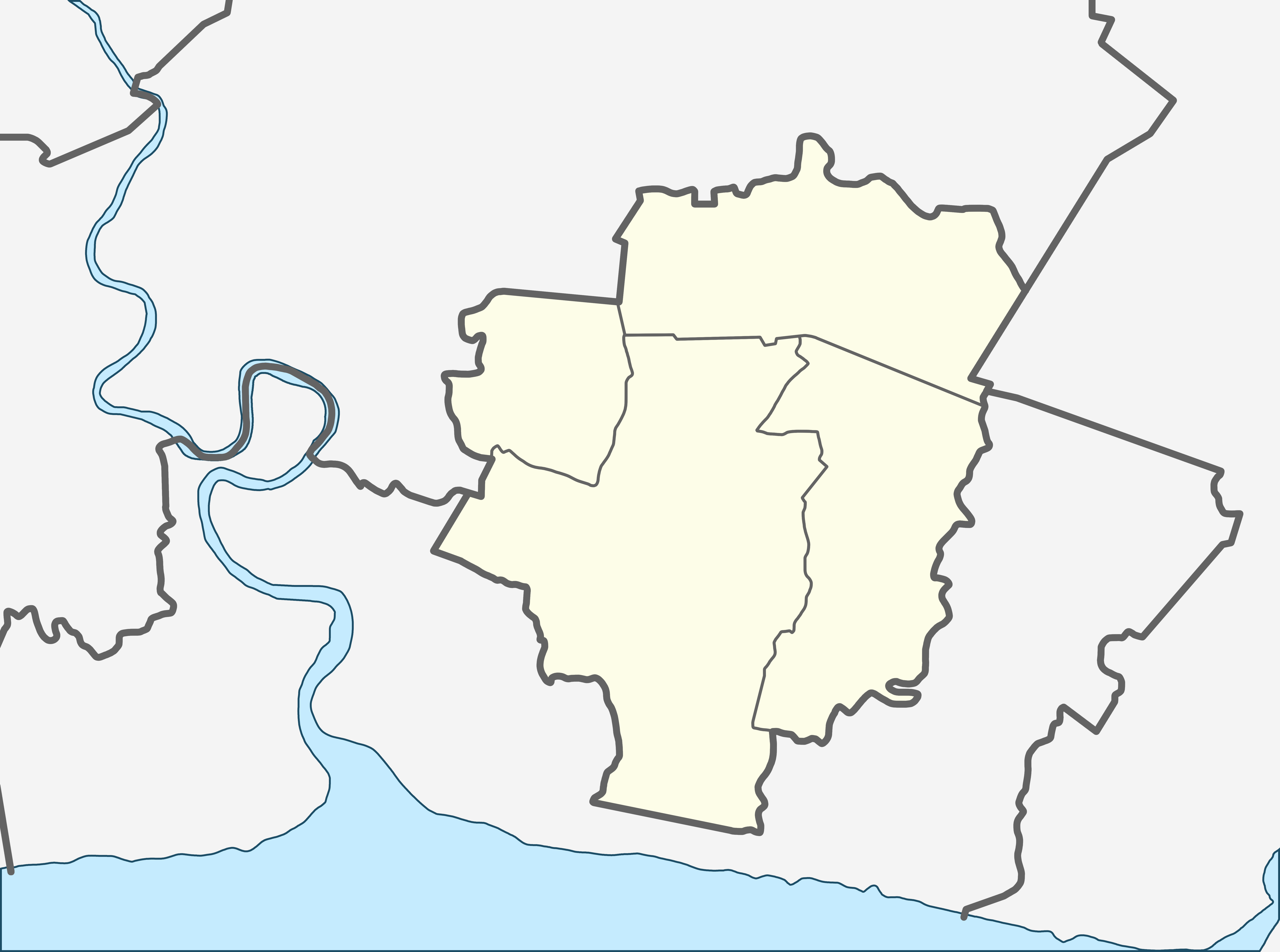
Nakhon Suvarnabhumi

The proposal was announced in October 2005, with a draft bill approved by the cabinet in June 2006. According to the bill, for the first four years the province would be run by a governor appointed by the Interior Ministry and supervised by a 30 member administrative board chaired by the prime minister. After four years the administrative board would be dissolved, but the final administrative structure of the province was never set. It was planned to become a special administrative zone, probably having an elected governor like Bangkok. A final bill was scheduled to be submitted after the political crisis of 2006, however after the coup d'état the project died.

The creation of a new province and development of the area around the airport was criticized by several groups, most notably the Bangkok Metropolitan Administration. The previously unsettled areas were used as part of the flood-prevention system of Bangkok, and may have been compromised by further urbanization in the area. The plan also received a negative response in surveys of the local population.

The proposal was withdrawn by a resolution of the cabinet dated 3 April 2007.
