= Dual (brand) =

Former German consumer electronics and turntable company

- Company type: Corporation
- Industry: Electronics
- Founded: Germany (1907)
- Headquarters: Heathrow, Florida
- Products: Audio, visual
- Website: Dual Electronics

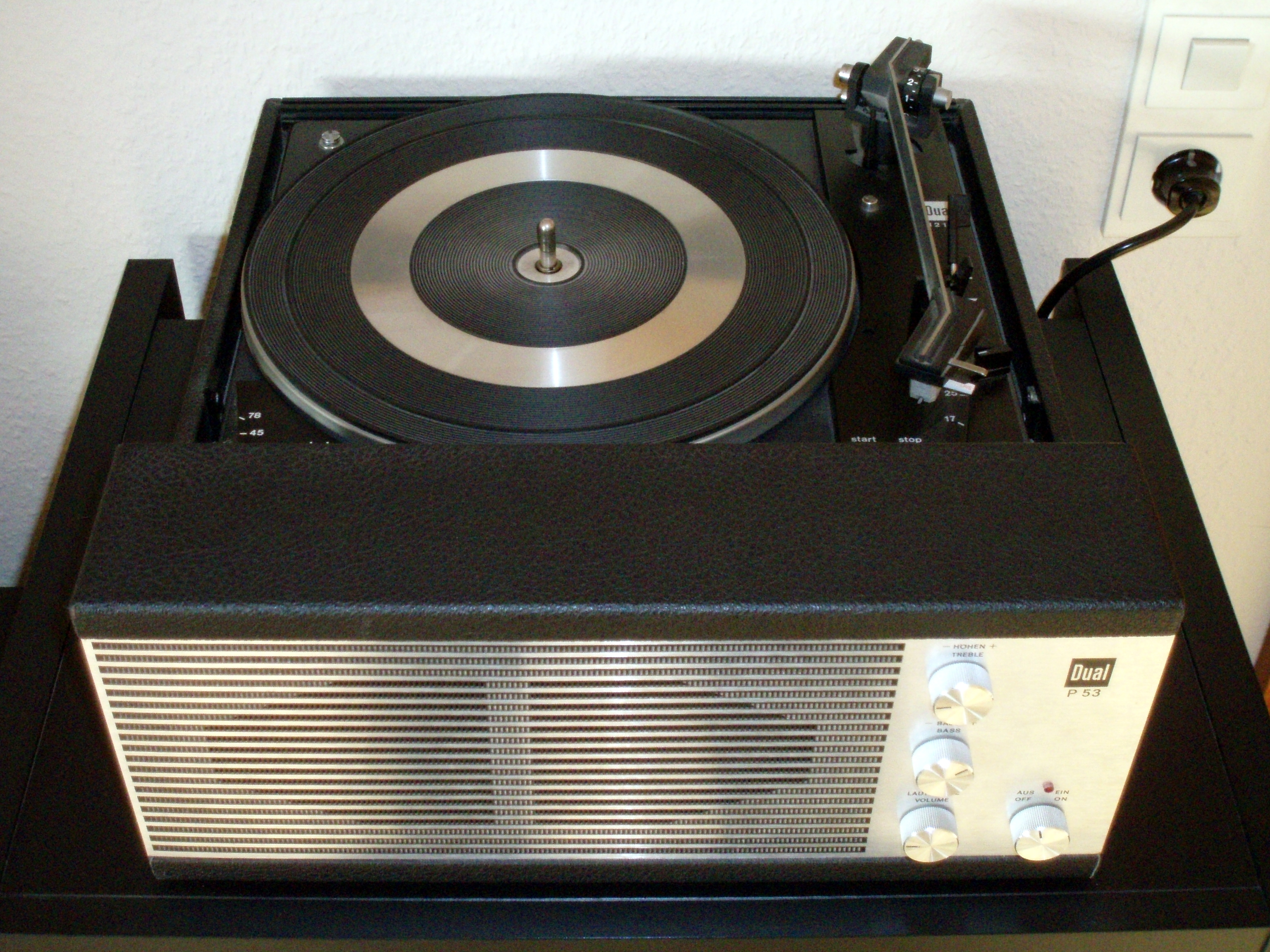
Dual P 53 record player with 1210 turntable

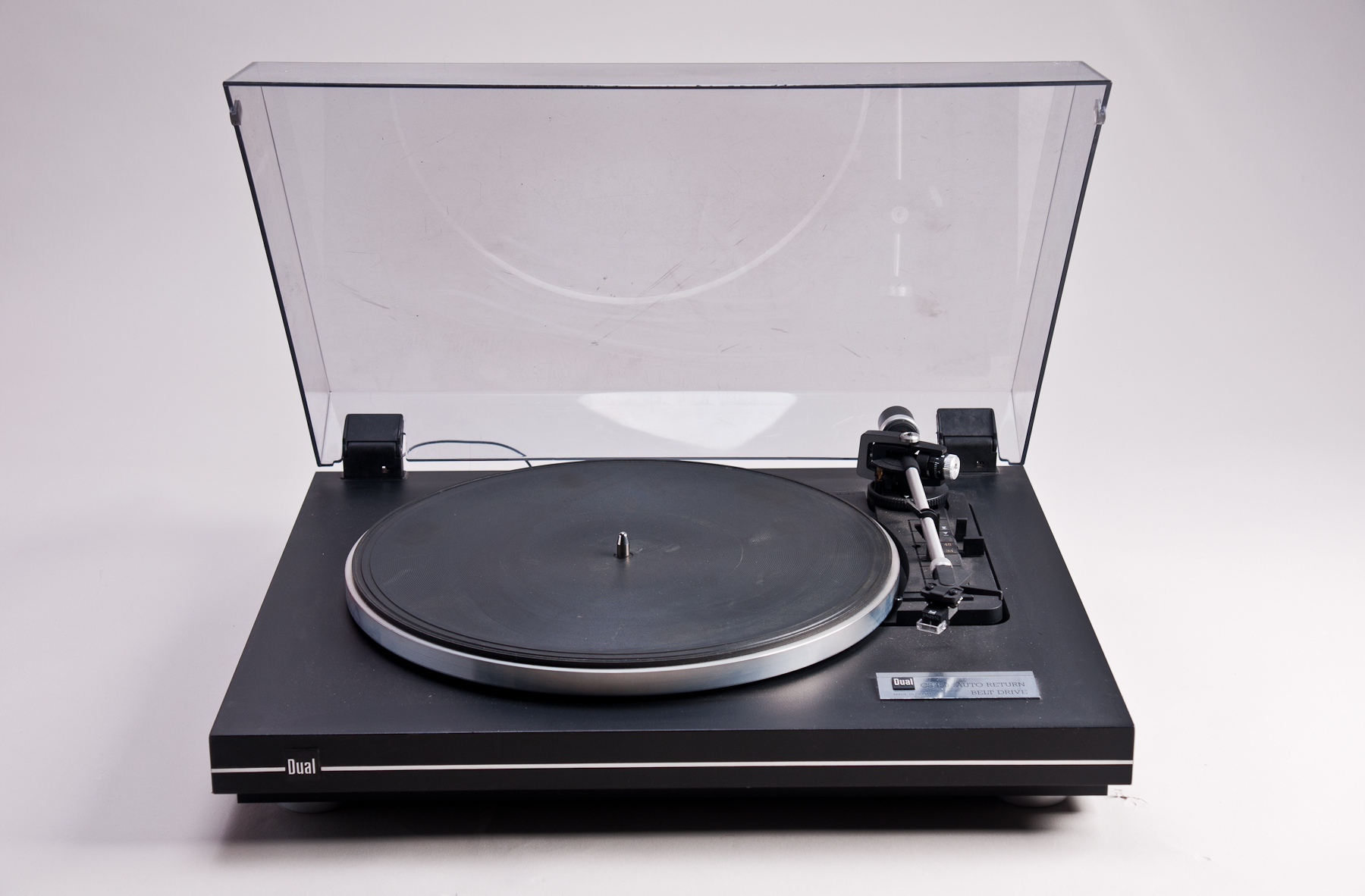
Dual CS450 record player, 1989

Dual is a brand name of audio and video electronics.

== History ==
In 1907, brothers Christian and Joseph Steidinger began manufacturing clockwork and gramophone parts in the Black Forest town of St. Georgen in Germany. In 1927, Gebrüder Steidinger (Steidinger Bros.) created the Dual-Motor, consisting of a spring loaded clock work and an electric motor. It proved successful and the company adopted the name Dual in 1935. Dual began producing turntables under that name the same year.

After World War II, Dual became the biggest manufacturer of turntables in Europe, with more than 3,000 employees working in several factories. Throughout the 1970s, 1980s, and 1990s, Dual introduced audio cassette players, VCRs, CD players, and other consumer electronics.

In the 1970s, Japanese consumer electronics entered European markets on a large scale. Japanese products usually offered a more modern package and more features at a lower price. As a result, and as most other traditional German manufacturers, Dual underwent a crisis. Dual went bankrupt in 1982, and was sold to French electronic manufacturer Thomson SA.

In 1988, Thomson sold Dual to German manufacturer Schneider Rundfunkwerke AG.

In 1993/4, Dual was split off into

- Dual Phono GmbH, i.e. the Dual line of turntables, which were acquired by the German company Alfred Fehrenbacher GmbH, which has continued to produce them in the Black Forest town of St. Georgen. Dual turntables Made in Germany are manufactured on the same traditional product line. They are easy to identify with the manufacturing code beginning with CS xxx.
- Dual DGC GmbH (Germany) sells mostly rebranded consumer electronics made in Far East, including turntables (production code DT xxx). DGC products are exclusively sold in Europe.
- For the American market, after the insolvency of Schneider Rundfunkwerke AG in 2001, TCL Holdings, a Chinese company, purchased the Dual assets and brand, and it began marketing its own products under the name. In 2002, Namsung Electronics, a Korean company, bought the rights to use the name in the Americas and began selling lower-priced (but generally well-reviewed) consumer electronics under the Dual marque. The main product lines are home audio, mobile audio, marine audio and GPS receivers.

Dual GmbH filed for bankruptcy on November 15, 2022. In March 2023, it was reported that an unspecified consortium of investors had taken over the company.

== See also ==
- List of phonograph manufacturers
