= InVision Technologies =

Airport security device manufacturer

- Type: Public
- Industry: Security devices
- Fate: Acquired by GE in 2004
- Successors: GE InVision; Homeland Protection; Morpho Detection
- Headquarters: Newark, California, United States
- Key people: Sergio Magistri (former CEO)
- Products: CTX explosive-detective device

InVision Technologies, Inc. was a publicly traded company based in Newark, California, that manufactured and sold airport security screening devices to detect explosives in passenger baggage. Formerly traded on the NYSE, one of its most well-known products is the CTX explosive-detection device. Among its founding members was Sauveur Chemouni.

Active in the 1990s, by 2001, InVision held 90% of the US market for bomb-detection machines. In 2002 it won a $170 million US government order to supply bomb detection machines to US airports. In 2004, General Electric bought the company for US$900 million. After being purchased, it was renamed GE InVision, then merged with another GE entity and renamed Homeland Protection. The division was then sold to Safran and rebranded Morpho Detection, before being sold to Smiths Group.

== History ==
Based first in Foster City, California and later in Newark, California, InVision developed a bomb-detecting device, dubbed CTX, which was a modified CAT scanner using a rotating X-ray device to render 3D images of luggage content, highlighting suspicious objects in red. InVision was launched in response to the 1988 Pan Am Flight 103 bombing, and started making bomb detection machines in 1990, with Europe as its primary market. By 1992, Invision Technologies had developed the CTX-5000 bomb detector for use at airline check-in counters.

US Congress ordered the Federal Aviation Administration (FAA) to develop new devices to protect airports and planes from bombs in 1990, with the FAA given a November 1993 deadline to have them in commercial operation. InVision Technologies and Imatron Federal Systems of Burke, Virginia began developing a version of the CTX-5000. The deadline was missed, due to difficulty with design, but it was certified by the FAA as a computerized airport explosive detection system in December of 1994.

InVision went public in 1996. In 1996, Sergio Magistri served as president and CEO. It installed its first two CTX 5000 SP systems at Chicago O'Hare and New York Kennedy airports on February 6, 1997. In February 1998, Invision Technologies along with Vivid Technologies supplied explosive detecting machines to Kennedy International Airport's new Terminal 1. The $1.7 million system was the first such system in the US. Also in 1998, CNN reported that tests by the Photographic and Imaging Manufacturers Association (PIMA) showed that InVision's new machine the CTX 5000, used in 16 airports worldwide including 6 in the US, damaged all film scanned. The FAA stated it was working to notify passengers to remove film from checked baggage. By the end of 2001, Invision had 90 percent of the US market for bomb-detection machines.

=== Airport and Transportation Act contract ===
After the September 11, 2001 terrorist attack on the World Trade Center in Manhattan, US Congress passed the Airport and Transportation Security Act. The Act mandated that by December 2002, all bags on US flights be checked with a bomb detector. The only two certified contractors to supply the machines at the time were InVision and L-3 Communications. In early 2002, InVision won a $169.8 million government order. By late 2002, 325 of the 429 airports in the US had machines installed, which were provided by either InVision and L-3. By then, the performance of the machines had been criticized by an FAA expert for a false alarm rate as high as 30%, and for missing explosives in some FAA tests. InVision and L-3 reported their false alarm rate at 22% in 2003. In December 2003, when InVision's historical production capacity of its million-dollar detection systems was 50 machines a month, the initial deadline was declared impossible, postponing the date to have 2,000 or more systems installed in federally superised airports. By then, 200 of the machines by InVision and L-3 were in place, with 200 more ordered.

=== GE ===
Trading on the NYSE, from 2003 to 2004, InVision's share value doubled as the demand for airport security products increased. In 2004, General Electric bought the company for $900 million (£499 million), with InVision to be combined into the GE Infrastructure division. GE Infrastructure completed the deal on December 6, 2004. After being acquired by GE, InVision was renamed GE InVision. Shortly after the deal was announced, in 2004 InVision won a $108 million contract with the US Department of Homeland Security to supply machines to detect bombs.

GE formed the Homeland Protection business by combining InVision Technologies with GE Security's Ion Track trace detection business. In 2006, the Homeland Protection business had reported annual revenue of about $300 million, with 700 employees. In 2007, a plan to combined Homeland Protection into a joint venture with Smiths Group was scrapped.

=== FCPA case ===
The company was notable, in part, because its case was the first time the US Department of Justice had resolved a Foreign Corrupt Practices Act (FCPA) case through a non-prosecution agreement. The charges were based upon conduct of the company's third party distributors (but not the company itself), while InVision's staff failed to timely investigate certain "red flag" emails copied to their addresses. The company voluntarily disclosed its findings resulting from internal investigations related to the issues which arose during the preparation for the acquisition of InVision by General Electric Company. The NPA, concluded in December 2004, required from the company, in part, a $800,000 penalty and a requirement to improve the enforcement of FCPA compliance.

On February 14, 2005, citing the Securities Exchange Act of 1934, the US Securities and Exchange Commission served GE InVision a cease-and-desist order over alleged violations of the Foreign Corrupt Practices Act, and requiring the incorporation of a compliance program. InVision was also given a fine. In February 2005, GE agreed to pay $1.1 million to settle the allegations, neither admitting or denying the charges.

=== Post-GE ownership ===
In April 2009, GE agreed to sell 81% of GE Homeland Protection for $580 million to the French company Safran. On July 1, 2009, the European Union approved the sale, and the deal closed in September 2009, with Homeland Protection placed under the Safran subsidiary Sagam Securite. GE sold its remaining 19% stake in 2012 for US $99 million.

By 2015, Homeland Security had been renamed Morpho Detection, and was an integrated unit of the Safran subsidiary Morpho. At the time, Morpho Detection supplied airports in Germany, Britain, and China, and had contracts with the US Department of Homeland Security.

In 2016, Safran sold Morpho Detection to the UK firm Smiths Group for $710 million. Morpho Detection was made part of Smiths Group's Smiths Detection division. In 2017, the explosive trace detection business owned by Morpho Detection was sold to OSI Systems.

== Products ==
InVision Technologies as of 2004 was focused on machines to detect explosives or narcotics in airport luggage, and according to the BBC, was a "pioneer" in what was called computed tomography technology, a form of X-ray imaging. Beyond security, it was also used to find defects in objects and timber.
