= Voxx International =

American electronics company

VOXX International Corporation
- Type: Subsidiary
- Founded: 1960; 66 years ago
- Founder: John J. Shalam
- Headquarters: 2351 J. Lawson Blvd. Orlando, Florida
- Key people: John J. Shalam (chairman); Patrick M. Lavelle (CEO); Charles M. Stoehr (CFO)
- Products: Consumer electronics Mobile electronics Accessories; Premium High End Audio
- Revenue: ▼US$464.8M (FY 2019)
- Operating income: ▼US$-41.2M (FY 2019)
- Net income: ▼US$-46.1M (FY 2019)
- Total assets: ▼US$508.8M (FY 2019)
- Total equity: ▼US$395.1M (FY 2019)
- Number of employees: 885 (FY 2019)
- Parent: Gentex Corporation
- Website: www.voxxintl.com

Voxx International Corporation was an American consumer electronics company founded as Audiovox Corporation in 1960, and renamed Voxx in 2012. It was headquartered in Orlando, Florida. The company specialized in four areas: OEM and after-market automotive electronics, consumer electronics accessories, and consumer and commercial audio equipment. It was purchased by Gentex in April 2025.

Over the years, Voxx International purchased a number of recognizable brandnames when the original companies were no longer viable as independent specialty shops, including Acoustic Research, Advent, Code Alarm, Invision, Jensen, Klipsch, Prestige, RCA, 808 Audio, and Terk, among others. Its international brands include Audiovox, Hirschmann, Heco, Incaar, Oehlbach, Mac Audio, Magnat, Schwaiger, and others. In addition, the company licensed the Energizer brand.

== History ==
In 2020, Voxx International Corporation announced the change of name Klipsch Holding, LLC, which became Premium Audio Company, LLC. Premium Audio Company, LLC consists of two subsidiaries: Klipsch Group, Inc (brands: Klipsch, Jamo, Energy, ProMedia) and 11 Trading Company, LLC.

In May 2021, Voxx International and Sharp Corporation began negotiations with Onkyo to purchase its home audiovisual division. Voxx's subsidiary Premium Audio Company (PAC) entered a joint venture with Sharp to acquire the business, which includes the Onkyo and Integra brands, for $30.8 million. PAC would own 75% of the joint venture and Sharp 25%. PAC would manage all product development, engineering, sales, marketing, and distribution while Sharp would be responsible for manufacturing and supply chain management of Onkyo products. The acquisition was completed in September 2021.

In April 2025, Voxx International was acquired by Gentex.

== Brands ==
Voxx International markets its products under several brand names, including:

- 808 Audio
- Acoustic Research
- Advent
- Alpine Electronics
- Astrostart
- Audiovox
- Automate
- Autostart
- Avital
- CarLink
- Champ
- Chipmunks
- Clifford
- Code-Alarm
- Directed Electronics
- FlashLogic
- Hirschmann
- Incaar
- InVision Technologies
- Jamo
- Jensen Electronics
- Klipsch
- Magnat
- Onkyo
- Pioneer Electronics
- Prestige
- Pursuit
- PursuiTrak
- Python
- RCA
- SmartStart
- Surface Clean
- Terk
- UTStarcom
- Viper
- Zentral Home Command

== Product types ==
=== Electronics ===
In 2013, Audiovox developed the app for a new accessory device called Shutterball. Cellcom Communications holds the exclusive rights to the device.

Around 2010, Audiovox developed various wireless communication products; some of these products were walkie-talkies and cordless phones.

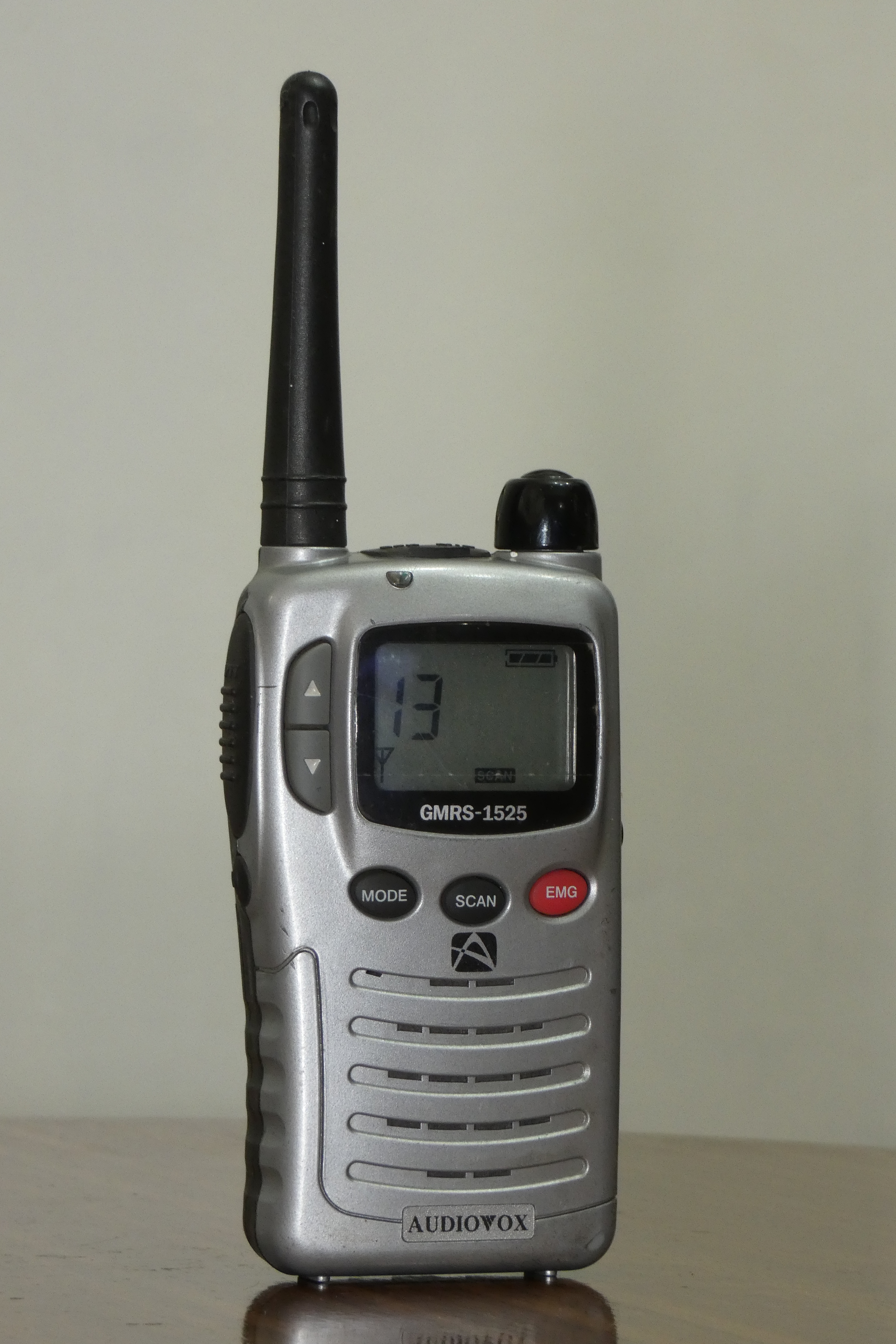
Audiovox GMRS-1525

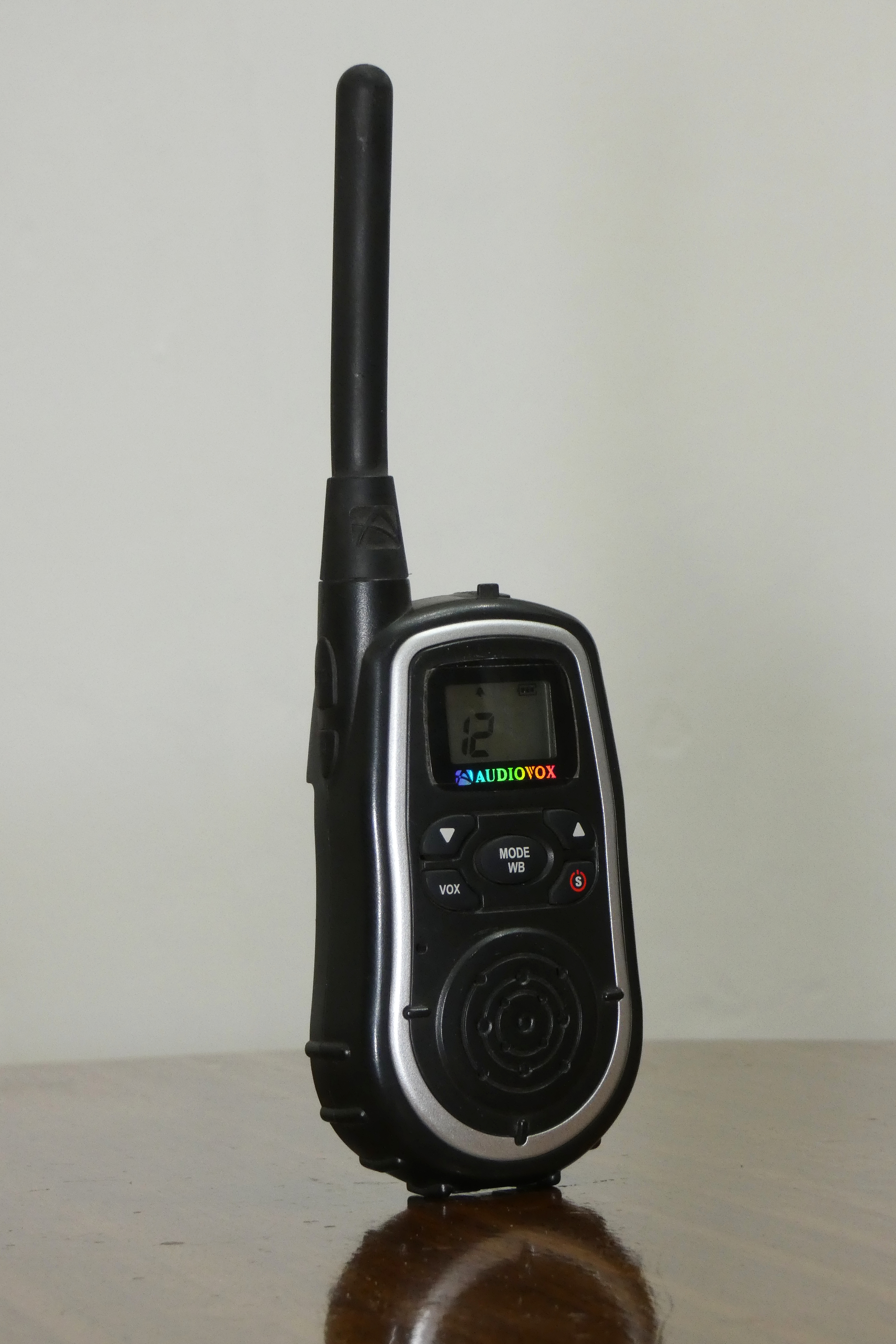
Audiovox walkie-talkie

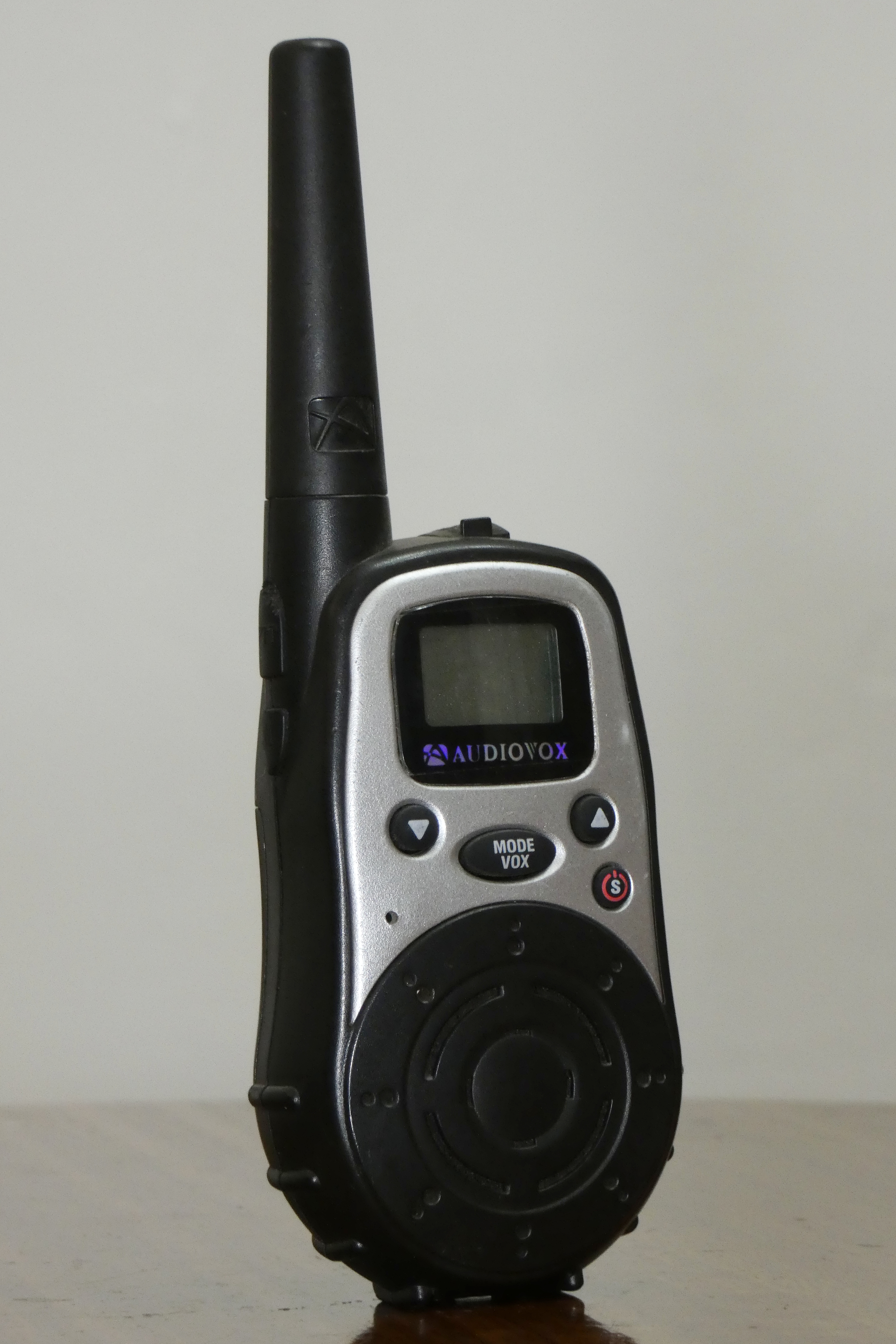
Audiovox GMRS-1582CH

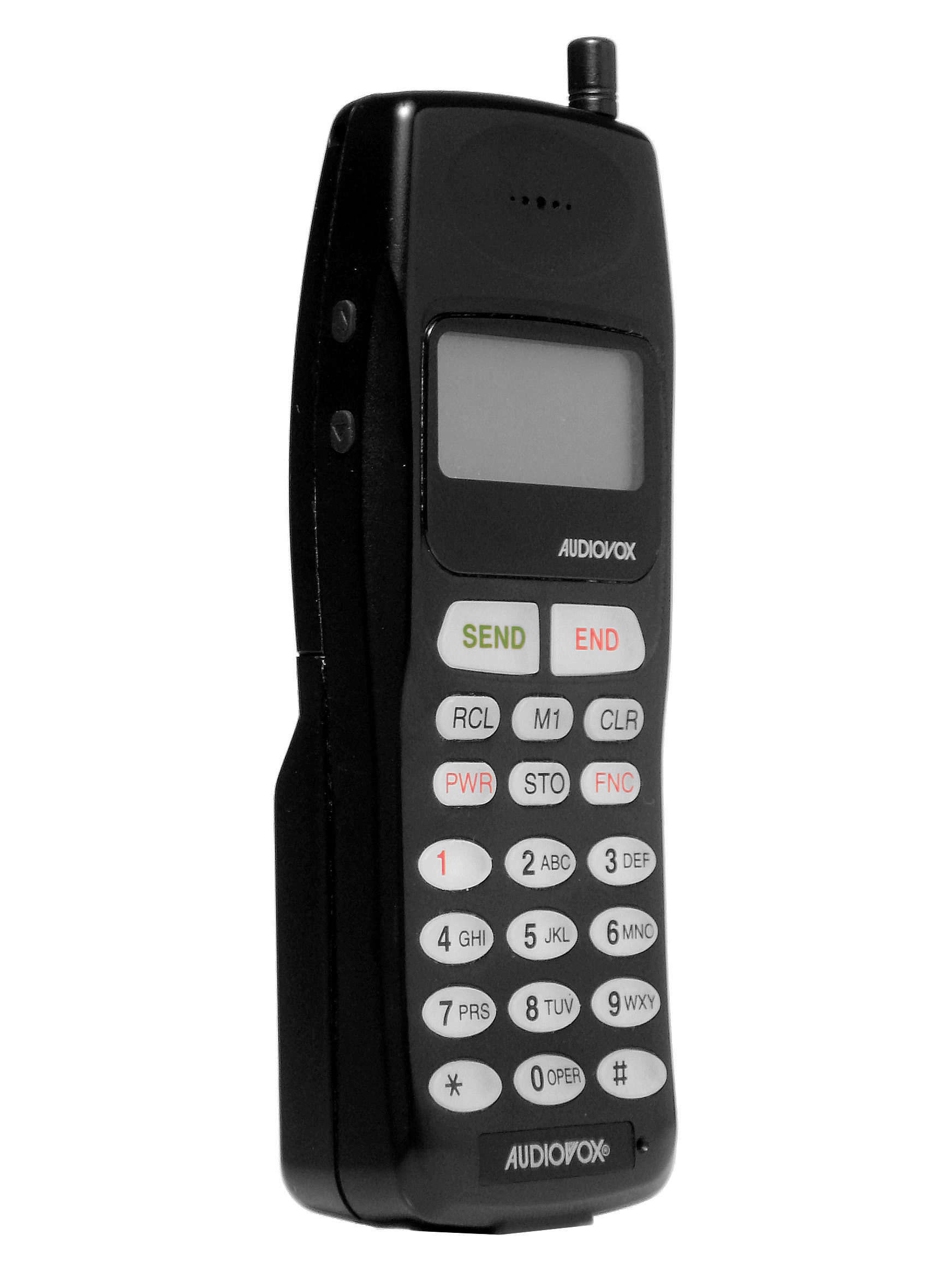
Audiovox wireless phone

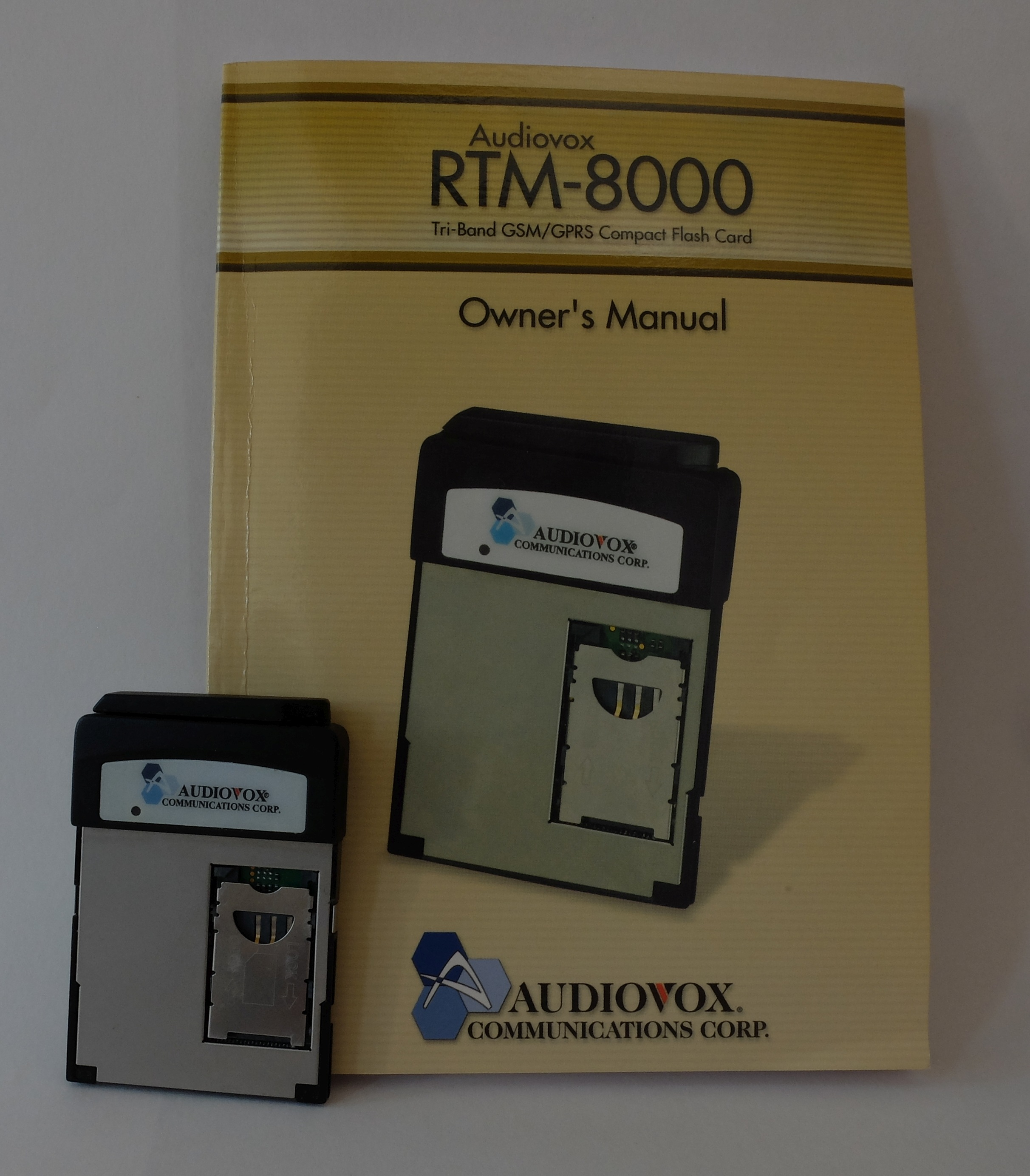
Audiovox RTM-8000 GSM/GPRS CompactFlash modem card

== Restatements ==
On March 14, 2003, Audiovox said it planned to restate results for the first three quarters of fiscal 2002, following a review of the effect of the FASB's Emerging Issues Task Force regulations on its statements. The restatement would lower revenue by about $462,000, and increase income by $36,000. On April 15, 2003, Audiovox announced to restate results for fiscal years 2000, 2001, and the first three quarters of fiscal 2002.
