= PACE Award =

Annual Automotive News award

PACE Award Trophy

The PACE Award is an annual award from Automotive News. The focus of the award is an innovation (i) developed primarily by a supplier, (ii) that is new to the automotive industry, (iii) that is in use (e.g., used on a vehicle in production), and (iv) that "changes the rules of the game". Awards have been given for products, materials, processes, capital equipment, software and services. A panel of independent judges from industry, finance, research, and academia choose finalists from the initial applicants, make site visits to evaluate the innovation, and then gather to select winners, independent of the sponsors. Winners to date include suppliers from Japan, Korea, China, the US, Canada, Brazil, Germany, France, Italy, Poland and other European countries. Among the most awarded companies over the years are BorgWarner, Delphi Automotive, Federal-Mogul (acquired in 2018 by Tenneco), Valeo and PPG Industries as well as Robert Bosch GmbH, Gentex Corporation, and Siemens.

Automotive News and Ernst & Young founded the program, which gave out the first awards in 1995 to celebrate innovation, technological advancement and business performance among automotive suppliers. The black-tie awards ceremony has been held just prior to the annual SAE (Society of Automotive Engineers) convention in Detroit. The costs of the program (administration, judges out-of-pocket expenses, and the award ceremony) are paid by a combination of application fees and money from sponsors. For the 2019-20 the sponsors were Deloitte, APMA (the Canadian Automotive Modernization Program) and Invest Canada. Historically the annual award cycle began with gathering applications (through the end of summer, with online submissions); the selection of 30-35 finalists, who were announced at the auto industry's annual Global Leadership Conference in October at the Greenbrier; site visits by judges in November and December; the selection of winners in late January or early February; and the announcement of winners at a black tie event in Detroit in March or April.

For the 2019–2020 award cycle PACE added recognition as a PACE Pilot, which targeted pre-commercial innovations, to try to capture the rise of innovations tied to safety, fuel efficiency, vehicle electrification and driving assist/driving automation. This award attempts to capture innovations earlier in the development cycle, e.g. when they show up in announcements at the Consumer Electronics Show.

Awards programs such as PACE are potential sources for studying the nature of technological change. One such attempt is in Smitka and Warrian (2017). In Chapter 6, "Automotive Innovation Model and the Supply Chain: PACE Awards", they find that: "The results indicate that technology-pull is dominant, not technology-push. We do observe some innovation that seems to represent using new materials to implement a well-understood approach that was not previously cost-effective or otherwise was not used. We also find the occasional bright idea that in some cases could have been implemented decades ago, had anyone thought to try. However, overall we find that new vehicle technologies are responses to regulatory pressure to improve safety, limit emissions, and improve fuel efficiency." Similarly, David Andrea notes in Forbes that: "While the popular press is having an interesting debate on whether Detroit or Silicon Valley will have the greatest influence over the mobility revolution, the 2019 PACE awards are dominated by the suppliers with the deepest R&D capabilities and longest histories of commercializing innovation. Reviewing the finalists, it is interesting that the vast majority, 26 of the 31 come from what would be considered "traditional suppliers." And only 6 of the firms are located outside 100 miles of industry's Detroit epicenter. Perhaps this is the result of selection bias as the process to submit applications, meet with judges, produce promotional materials and the like is not small in budget of executive time and funds, two resources always in short supply in smaller firms or start-ups."

== 1990s ==
=== 1995 ===
- AP Technoglass Company
- Dana
- Gentex Corporation
- Johnson Controls
- Philips Service Industries

=== 1996 ===
- Cherry GmbH
- Delco Electronics
- Fayette Tubular Products
- Gage Products Company
- Progressive Tool and Industries Company (PICO)

=== 1997 ===
- Robert Bosch GmbH
- Dana - Auto Mate 2
- Gentex Corporation - Gentex Metal Reflector
- Johnson Controls - HomeLink
- Rapid Design Services

=== 1998 ===
- Benteler International - Thermally Efficient, Air-Gap Manifold and Exhaust Tube Applications, Parts and Systems
- Cooper Automotive/Wagner Lighting - Chrysler Dakota and Durango Front Lamp Assembly and Related Manufacturing and Assembly Process
- Dürr AG - Radiant Floor Construction (RFC) Paint Oven
- Eaton Corporation - Eaton Spicer Solo
- Gentex Corporation - Aspheric Auto-Dimming Exterior Mirror
- Johnson Controls - CorteX

=== 1999 ===
- ASHA Corporation - GERODISC (limited slip, hydro-mechanical coupling device)
- Benteler International - WIN88 Rear Twist Beam Axle
- Delphi Corporation - Stabilitrak
- Goodyear - run-flat tires
- Meritor - RHP Highway Parallelogram Trailer Air Suspension System
- Motorola - 32-bit engine management controller
- Stackpole Limited - high load-bearing Powdered Metal Parts
- Teleflex Automotive Group - Adjustable Pedal System

== 2000s ==
=== 2000 ===
- Autoliv - ASH-2 inflationary device
- Delphi Delco Electronics Systems - Adaptive Cruise Control
- Gentex Corporation - Binary, Complementary Synthetic-White LED Illuminators
- The Gleason Works - Power Dry Cutting/UMC Ultima Axle Gear Manufacturing
- Lumileds - SnapLED
- PPG Industries - Powder Clearcoat Paint
- Rieter - Ultra Light acoustic vehicle treatment
- Siemens - keyless entry system

=== 2001 ===
Source: Product Innovation:

- Hendrickson International - Integrated Front Air Suspension and Steer Axle System
- PPG Industries - Acoustic Coating
- Raytheon - Night Vision
- Tenneco - ASD (Acceleration Sensitive Damping)

Information Technology/Internet:

- Delphi Automotive - Math Based Metal Removal (MBMR) software
- Quality Measurement Control - CM4D Analyze software system

Management Practice:

- ZF Friedrichshafen - Ergonomically based job assignment employee rotation process in its Tuscaloosa, Alabama plant

Manufacturing Process:

- Nucap Industries - NUCAP Retention System

Europe:

- Robert Bosch GmbH - High Pressure Common Rail

Open Category - Enduring Innovations:

- Shape Corporation - Tubular High Strength Swept Bumpers

Open Category - Environmental:

- BASF - Integrated Process

=== 2002 ===
Product Innovation:

- Delphi Automotive - Quadrasteer
- Delphi Deco Electronics Systems - Passive Occupant Detection System, Generation II (PODS II)
- Goodyear - Wrangler maximum traction/reinforced, off-road tire (MT/R)
- PPG Industries - Transportation Coating - FrameCoat Electrocoating
- The POM Group - Direct Metal Deposition process

Europe:

- Robert Bosch GmbH - Aerotwin windshield wipers
- ZF Getriebe GmbH

Information Technology:

- Engineous Software - iSight software for process integration and design optimization

=== 2003 ===
Product Innovation:

- 3M - Solar Reflecting Film
- Delphi Automotive - MagneRide variable suspension damping
- Federal-Mogul Corporation - Wagner ThermoQuiet Brake Pads and Shoes
- Material Sciences Corporation - Acoustically engineered steel laminate Quiet Steel
- PPG Industries - Ceramic clearcoat paint

Product Europe:

- Siemens VDO Automotive - Piezo Common Rail Diesel Direct Injection System

Manufacturing Process & Capital Equipment:

- Bishop Steering Technology - Warm Forging Die and Integrated Automatic Precision Forging Cell
- Dürr AG - RoDip 3 electro-coating
- The POM Group - RapiDIES foam forming process
- Robert Bosch GmbH - Cassette Chrome Plating Process

Information Technology & Services:

- Perceptron Inc. - AutoGauge FMS In-Process Measuring System

=== 2004 ===
Product Innovation:

- Delphi Delco Electronics Systems - Delphi Forewarn Back-up Aid and Side Alert
- Denso - Very High Pressure Solenoid Fuel Injection System
- Johnson Controls - Overhead Rail Vehicle Personalization System
- Visteon - Long Life Filtration Systems

Product Europe:

- TRW Automotive - Active Control seatbelt retractor

Process:

- BASF - ColorCARE software for controlling and comparing paint color
- DuPont - Wet on Wet Two Tone Products
- Filter Specialists - FERRX 5000 magnetic separation device to remove ferrous particles of the initial, e-coat, prior to the application of base coat paint

Information Technology:

- AutoForm Engineering - DieDesigner Stamping FEA Simulation Geometry Generation
- Delphi Automotive - horizontal modeling and digital process design for CAD/CAM
- Motorola - VIAMOTO navigation system

=== 2005 ===
Product:

- Dura Automotive Systems - Racklift Window Lift System
- Gentex Corporation - SmartBeam Headlamp Dimming Microelectronics Solution
- Illinois Tool Works - Direct Fuel System (DFS)
- Multimatic - I-Beam Control Arm
- Tenneco - Kinetic RFS (Reverse Function Stabilizer) technology
- Valeo - Lane Departure Warning System

Product Europe:

- Advanced Automotive Antennas - Fractal Antennas
- BorgWarner - DualTronic dual clutch transmission - more commonly known as Volkswagen Group's Direct-Shift Gearbox (DSG)
- Siemens VDO Automotive - Information Systems Passenger Cars reconfigurable color head-up display

Manufacturing Process & Capital Equipment:

- Siemens VDO Automotive - DEKA VII Low Pressure Electronic Gasoline Fuel Injectors

Information Technology & Services:

- i2 Technologies - Optimal Scheduler software for auto assembly plants

Innovative OEM Collaborator Awards:

- Chrysler with Dura Automotive Systems - Improved Window-Lift Systems
- Mercedes-Benz with Sick AG - Entry/Exit Light Curtain

=== 2006 ===
Product:

- Federal-Mogul Corporation - Monosteel Diesel Piston
- Illinois Tool Works - BosScrew Fastener
- Magneti Marelli - Software Flexfuel Sensor (SFS) for Flexible-fuel vehicles
- Osram Opto Semiconductors - Color on Demand interior lighting
- SKF - X-Tracker Asymmetric Hub Bearing Unit

Product Europe:

- Preh Automotive - Windshield Defogging Sensor
- Tenneco - Low Cost, Low Weight Muffler
- Valeo - StARS Micro-Hybrd system

Manufacturing Process & Capital Equipment:

- Dow Automotive - Betamate LESA Adhesive System
- PosiCharge - Battery Charging System

Information Technology:

- CogniTens - OptiCell Non-Contact Measuring System for quality control inspection

Innovative OEM Collaborator Awards:

- General Motors with PPG Industries - Color Harmony Process
- Ford with PosiCharge - Fast Charging Battery Technology

=== 2007 ===
Product:

- Alcoa - Dura-Bright Wheels with XBR Technology
- Autoliv - Safety Vent Airbag
- Federal-Mogul Corporation - HTA (High Temperature Alloy) Exhaust Gaskets
- Halla Climate Control Corp - Wave Blade Fan and Saw Tooth Shroud
- Valeo - Multi-Beam Radar (MBR) Blind-Zone Radar Sensor

Product Europe:

- BorgWarner Turbo & Emissions Systems - BorgWarner Turbo & Emissions Systems Gasoline Turbocharger with Variable Turbine Geometry
- Federal-Mogul Corporation Goetze Diamond Coating (GDC) (Piston Ring Coating)

Manufacturing Process & Capital Equipment:

- Behr GmbH & Co. KG - BehrOxal surface treatment for corrosion protection
- DuPont - DuPont EcoConcept paint and process
- Hirotec - E3 Hemming Press

Information Technology:

- RTT USA - RTT DeltaGen visualization toolset
- Tenneco - Diesel Aftertreatment Predictive Development Process

Innovative OEM Collaborator Awards:

- Porsche with BorgWarner Turbo & Emissions Systems - BorgWarner Turbo & Emissions Systems Gasoline Turbocharger with Variable Turbine Geometry
- Porsche with BorgWarner TorqTransfer Systems - BorgWarner High Energy ITM3e AWD System
- Volkswagen with DuPont - DuPont EcoConcept paint and process

=== 2008 ===
Product:

- Cummins - Cummins 6.7-liter Turbo diesel
- Dow Automotive - IMPAXX Energy Absorbing Foam
- Eaton Corporation - CRUTONITE Valve Alloy
- Gentex Corporation - Rear Camera Display (RCD) Mirror
- Magneti Marelli - Tetrafuel System for use with Gasoline, Ethanol or Compressed Natural Gas
- Xanavi Informatics Corporation and Sony Corporation - Around View Monitor (AVM)

Product Europe:

- BorgWarner Turbo & Emissions Systems - Turbocharger with R2S Regulated Two-Stage Technology
- Continental AG - Direct Injection System for Gasoline Applications
- Valeo - Park 4U Semi-Automatic Parallel Parking

Manufacturing Process & Capital Equipment:

- PPG Industries - Green Logic Paint Detackification Process
- Webasto - Panoramic Polycarbonate Roof Module

Information Technology and Services:

- Delphi Automotive - Sirius Backseat TV

Innovation Partnership Awards:

- Chrysler with Mahle GmbH - CamInCam Variable valve timing (VVT) camshaft
- Honda with Takata Corporation - Motorcycle Airbag System
- Nissan with Xanavi Informatics Corporation and Sony Corporation - Around View Monitor (AVM)

=== 2009 ===
Product:

- BorgWarner Morse TEC - Morse TEC CTA Camshaft Phasing System
- Eaton Corporation - Eaton Twin Vortices Supercharger - TVS
- Futuris Automotive - Tufted PET Carpet
- Magna Mirrors - BlindZone Mirror

Product Europe:

- BorgWarner BERU Systems - Pressure Sensor Glow Plug (PSG) for Diesel Engines
- LuK GmbH & Co. - LuK Double Clutch for Double Clutch Transmissions
- TI Automotive - Saddle-Shaped PZEV Plastic Fuel Tank

Manufacturing Process & Capital Equipment:

- Alcoa - Alcoa's Vacuum Die Casting (AVDC) for Lightweight Door Assemblies
- Henkel - Bonderite TecTalis Pre-treatment Process

Information Technology & Services:

- Dassault Systèmes - DELMIA Automation digital manufacturing and production software solution
- Microsoft - Microsoft Auto

Innovation Partnership Awards:

- Ford with BorgWarner Morse TEC
- General Motors with Futuris Automotive

== 2010s ==
=== 2010 ===
Product:

- Delphi Automotive - Electronically Scanning Radar
- Dura Automotive Systems - Horizontal Sliding Rear Window with Defrost
- Meridian Lightweight Technologies - Single Piece Cast Magnesium Liftgate Inner Panel
- PPG Industries - Super High Power Electrocoat
- TI Automotive - Dual Channel Single Stage (DCSS 39-50) Electric fuel Pump
- WABCO Vehicle Control Systems - OptiDrive Transmission Automation System

Product Europe:

- Continental/NGK Insulators - Smart NOx Sensor
- Delphi Corporation Powertrain Systems Division - Delphi direct Acting Piezo Injector
- Federal-Mogul Corporation - Bayonet Connection System for Profile Wiper Blades
- ZF Getriebe GmbH - ZF 8HP 8 Automatic Transmission

Manufacturing Process & Capital Equipment:

- Henkel - Aquence Autodeposition and Co-Cure Paint Process
- Dürr AG - EcoDryScrubber paint overspray retrieval system
- Federal-Mogul Corporation - DuraBowl Piston Reinforcement Process
- Federal-Mogul Corporation - High Precision Electro-Erosion Machining
- Johnson Controls/Nordenia Deutschland - molded polypropylene (PP) Thin Film

Informatian Technology & Services:

- Siemens PLM Software - Teamcenter In-Vehicle Software (IVS) Management System

Innovation PArtnership Awards:

- Bombardier Recreational Products with Robert Bosch GmbH - Vehicle Stability System (VSS) for a 3-Wheeled Vehicle
- Ford with Clarion Corporation of America - Next Generation Navigation System
- Ford with Dura Automotive Systems - Horizontal Sliding Rear window with Defrost
- Ford with Meridian Lightweight Technologies - Single Piece Cast Magnesium Liftgate Inner Panel

=== 2011 ===
Product:

- Delphi Automotive - Delphi Multec GDi Fuel Injector
- Federal-Mogul Corporation - EcoTough Piston Coating for Gasoline Engines
- Federal-Mogul Corporation - Low-Friction LKZ Oil Control Ring (Innovative Two-piece Oil Ring for Direct-Injection Gasoline Engines)
- Henkel - Terophon High Damping Foam
- Honeywell Turbo Technologies - Honeywell DualBoost Turbocharger for Medium Duty Diesel Engines
- Janesville Acoustics - Molded Fiber IP Closeputs with Integrated Lighting and Ducts
- Key Safety Systems - Inflatable Seat Belt System
- Mahle GmbH - Electrical Waste Gate Actuator
- Osram Opto Semiconductors GmbH - LED Headlamp
- Robert Bosch GmbH - Bosch P2 Parallel Full Hybrid Electric Vehicle System
- Schaeffler Technologies - Lightweight Balance Shaft with Roller Bearings

Manufacturing Process:

- Takata Corporation - Vacuum Folding Technology

Innovative Partnership Awards:

- Chrysler with Janesville Acoustics - Molded Fiber IP Closeputs with Integrated Lighting and Ducts
- Ford with Dassault Systèmes - Powertrain Digital Integration and Automation (PDIA)
- Ford with Key Safety Systems - Inflatable Seat Belt System

=== 2012 ===
Product:

- BorgWarner Turbo Systems - Turbocharger for Internal Combustion Engines with Low-Pressure Exhaust Gas Recirculation
- Delphi Automotive - Delphi L-Shape Crimp for 0.13 mm2 wire size
- Hendrickson Auxiliary Axle Systems - Compliant Tie rod (CTR) Assembly and Damping System with PerfecTrak Technology
- Honeywell Turbo Technologies - High Temperature, Ball Bearing (HTBB) VNT Turbo
- Lear Corporation - Lear Solid State Smart Junction Box (S3JB)
- Magna Mirrors - Infinity Mirror with touch screen technology
- Methode Electronics Innovative TouchSensor Controls to Ford's MyFord Touch User Interface System
- Schaeffler Technologies - UniAir Fully Variable Valve Lift System
- Valeo - VisioBlade System (high-efficiency adaptive windshield washer system)

Manufacturing Process:

- Delphi Automotive - Delphi Thermal Multi Port Folded Tube Condenser
- Federal-Mogul Corporation - Two-Dimensional Ultrasonic Testing for Raised Gallery Diesel Pistons (Manufacturing Process)
- Nalco Company - APEX Program-Sustainable Technology for Paint Detackification
- PPG Industries - B1 and B2 Compact Process Paint Technology
- 3M/Esys Automation - Robotic Production System with Wheel Weights for Precision Tire and Wheel Balancing

Innovation Partnership Awards:

- Fiat Powertrain and Chrysler with Schaeffler Technologies - UniAir Fully Variable Valve Lift System
- Ford with Dana - Active Warm-up Heat Exchanger with Integrated Thermal Bypass Valve

=== 2013 ===
Product

- BorgWarner Turbo Systems - Regulated 3--turbocharger System (R3S)
- Brose North America - Hands-free Liftgate Opener
- Continental Interior Division, Body and Security - Tire Pressure Monitoring System (LocSync)
- Continental Chassis & Safety Division, ADAS Business Unit - 24GHZ ISM Band Short Range Radar
- Dana - Diamond Series Driveshafts
- Delphi Automotive - F2E Distributed Pump Common Rail System
- Federal-Mogul - Coating for Engine Bearings
- GPM GmbH - Electro-Hydraulic Controlled Flow (ECF) Water Pump
- Halla Visteon Climate Control Corporation - Metal Seal Fitting
- PPG Industries - Andaro Tint Dispersion
- Valeo - Air Intake Module with integrated Water Charge Air Cooler

Manufacturing Process and Capital Equipment

- Federal-Mogul - Injection Molding of High Modulus Bonded Pistons used in High Pressure Transmissions
- Schuler Hydroforming Division - Hydroforming and Global Die Standardization Process

Information Technology

- Hughes Telematics - Automotive Software Remote Update Technology

Innovation Partnership Winners

- BMW with BorgWarner Turbo Systems - Regulated 3-turbocharger System (R3S)
- General Motors with Takata Corporation - Front Center Airbag
- Mercedes-Benz with Hughes Telematics - Automotive Software Remote Update Technology
- Toyota with Continental Chassis & Safety Division, ADAS Business Unit - 24GHZ ISM Band Short Range Radar
- Volkswagen with Valeo - Air Intake Module

=== 2014 ===
Product

- Autoliv Inc. - Vårgårda Sweden - "Green" Airbag Inflator
- BASF Corp. - Wyandotte. Mich. - Mold in Color High Touch, High Gloss Black Interior Door Switch Bezels
- BorgWarner Transmission Systems - Auburn Hills, Mich. - BorgWarner Stop/Start Accumulator Solenoid Valve (Eco-Launch™ Solenoid Valve)
- Continental Automotive - Chassis and Safety Business Unit - Auburn Hills, Mich. - Pressure Sensor for Pedestrian Protection (PPS pSAT)
- Delphi Automotive - Warren, Ohio - ErgoMate™ Mechanical Assist System
- Dow Automotive Systems - Auburn Hills, Mich. - BETAMATE™ Epoxy Structural Adhesive for Durable Bonding of Untreated Aluminum
- Federal-Mogul – Wiesbaden, Germany - High Performance Bearings Without Lead
- HELLA KGaA Hueck & Co. - Lippstadt, Germany - LED Matrix Beam Head Lights
- Robert Bosch LLC - Farmington Hills, Mich. - Spray Enhancements in Gasoline Direct Injection Enabled by Laser Drilling
- Schaeffler Group - Wooster, Ohio - Torque Converter with Centrifugal Pendulum Absorber
- Valeo - Driving Assistance Product Group - Bietigheim-Bissingen, Germany - Back-over Protection System
- ZF Friedrichshafen - Saarbrucken, Germany - Car Powertrain Technology Division - ZF's 9-speed Automatic Transmission

Manufacturing Process and Capital Equipment

- ArcelorMittal and Magna-Cosma International - Chicago - Laser Ablation Process
- Henkel Corporation - Madison Heights, Mich. - BONDERITE® 2798™ Process for High Aluminum
- TI Automotive - Auburn Hills, Mich. - Adaptable Plastic Fuel Tank Advanced Process Technology (TAPT) for all vehicle powertrains

Innovation Partnership Winners

- Ford for partnership on the high-gloss black interior door switch bezels with BASF Corporation
- General Motors for partnership on the Eco-Launch™ solenoid valve with BorgWarner Transmission Systems
- Honda R&D Americasfor partnership on the laser ablation process with ArcelorMittal and Magna-Cosma International
- Paccar for partnership on the BETAMATE™ structural adhesive for untreated aluminum with Dow Automotive Systems
- Tesla Motors for partnership on the Tegra® Visual Computing Module (VCM) with NVIDIA Corporation
- Volvo Car Corporation for partnership on the pedestrian protection airbag with Autoliv Inc.

=== 2015 ===
- BorgWarner - Limited-slip differential for front-wheel drive >> Detailed citation
- ContinentalAG - Printed circuit board for transmission control units >> Detailed citation
- Continental Automotive Systems Inc. - Multiapplication unified sensor element >> Detailed citation
- Denso- Standardized HVAC unit >> Detailed citation
- Federal-Mogul- DuroGlide piston ring coating >> Detailed citation
- Federal-Mogul - MicroTorq seal for rotating shafts >> Detailed citation
- FTE automotive - 2Polymer hydraulic gear shift actuator >> Detailed citation
- GKN Driveline - Two-speed gearbox for electrified vehicles >> Detailed citation
- Magna Closures - PureView seamless sliding window >> Detailed citation
- Mahle - Evotec 2 lightweight piston >> Detailed citation
- Nvidia - Tegra visual computing module >> Detailed citation
- Osram Opto Semiconductors - Oslon black flat multichip family >> Detailed citation
- Sika Automotive - Adhesive for mixed material bonding >> Detailed citation
- Valeo Electrical Systems - Efficient alternator >> Detailed citation

== 2020s ==
=== 2020 ===
- American Axle & Manufacturing, Detroit - Electric driveline
- Continental Structural Plastics, Auburn Hills, Mich. Subsidiary of Teijin- CarbonPro pickup box
- Delphi Technologies, Kokomo, Ind. - DIFlex-integrated circuit
- EJOT Fastening Systems, Wixom, Mich. - EJOWELD friction element welding
- Gentex Corp., Zeeland, Mich. - Integrated toll module
- Lear Corp., Southfield, Mich. - Xevo commerce and service platform
- Magna Exteriors, Troy, Mich. - Composite space frame
- Marelli, Auburn Hills, Mich. - h-Digi lighting module
- Mobileye REM Division, Jerusalem - Road Experience Management
- Schaeffler Technologies, Herzogenaurach, Germany - Compact coaxial transmission for e-axle
- Stoneridge, Novi, Mich. - MirrorEye camera monitor system
- Tenneco, Southfield, Mich. - IROX2 bearing coating
- Valeo, Bietigheim-Bissingen, Germany - XtraVue trailer

== See also ==
- List of motor vehicle awards
- International Engine of the Year
- Progressive Insurance Automotive X Prize
- RJC Car of the Year
- Ward's 10 Best Engines
