= Lear Corporation =

American automotive parts manufacturer

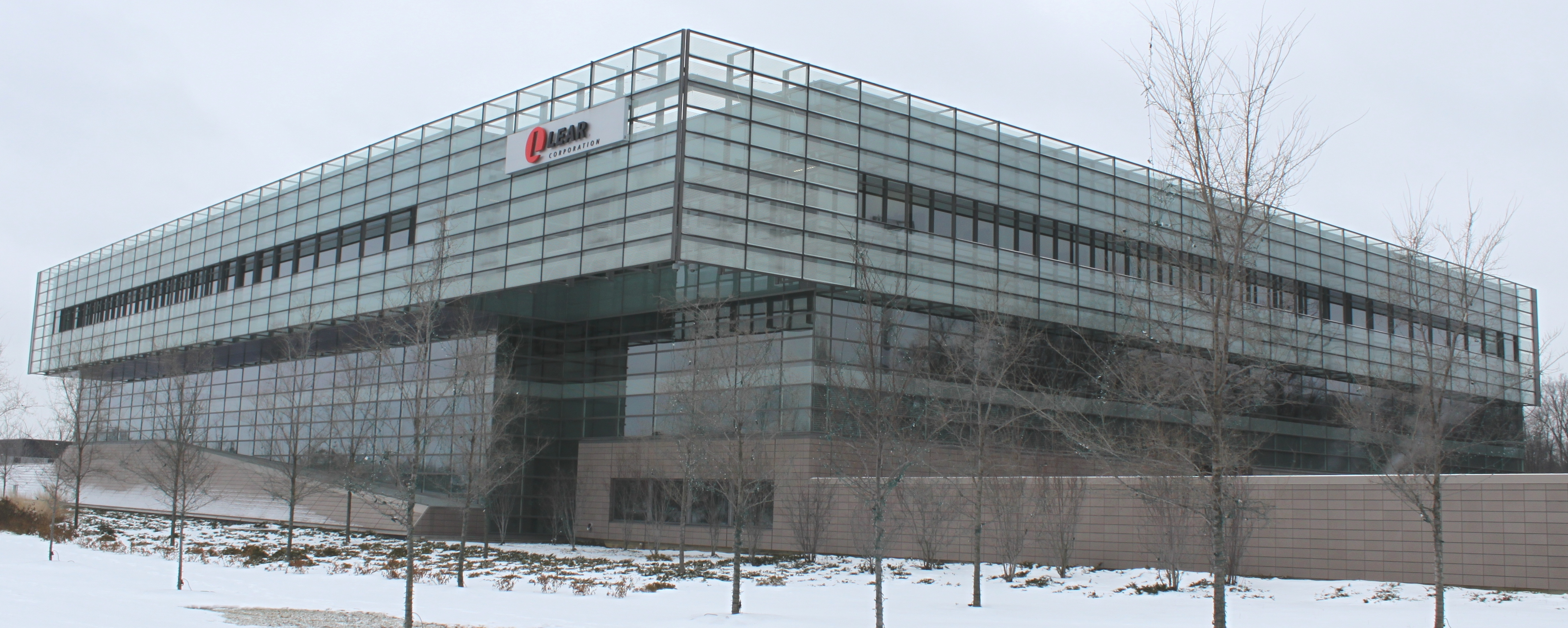
- Lear headquarters building
- Formerly: American Metal Products
- Type: Public
- Traded as: NYSE: LEA; S&P 400 component; Russell 1000 component
- Industry: Manufacturing
- Founded: Detroit, Michigan (1917)
- Headquarters: Southfield, Michigan, United States
- Number of locations: 257 locations in 39 countries (2017)
- Area served: International
- Key people: Raymond E. Scott (President, CEO, and Director); Terry Larkin (Executive Vice President, Business Development and General Counsel)
- Services: Supplier of automotive seating and electrical
- Revenue: ▼US$23.3 billion (2025)
- Net income: ▼US$437 million (2025)
- Number of employees: 173,700 (2024)
- Divisions: Seating and Electrical
- Website: lear.com

Lear Corporation is an American company that manufactures automotive seating and electrical systems. In 2019, it ranked #147 and in 2018, it ranked #148 on the Fortune 500 list.

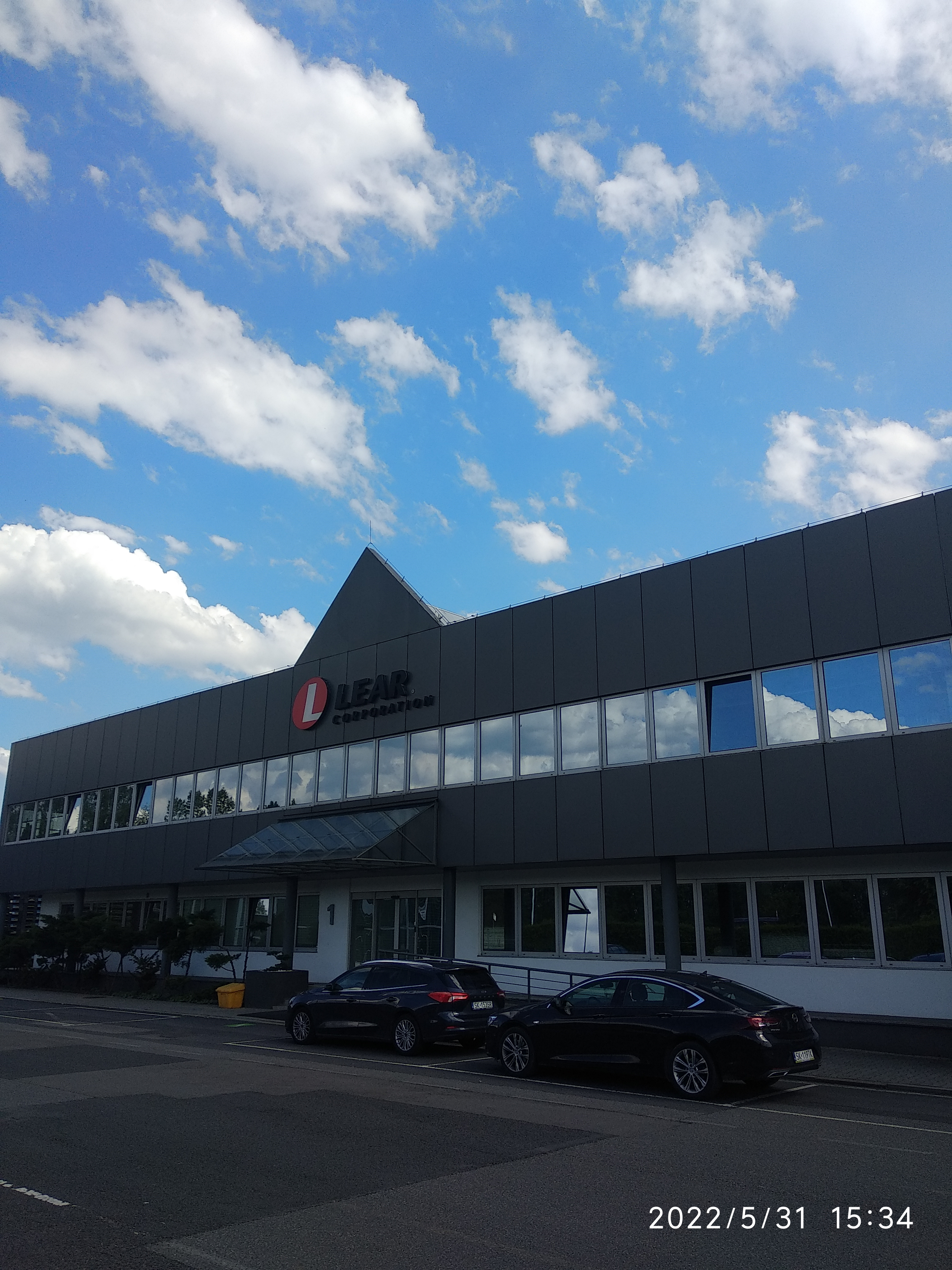

== Early stages ==
Lear Corporation was launched as American Metal Products in 1917 in Detroit, Michigan. At the time of its founding it was engaged in the manufacture of tubular, welded and stamped assemblies for the aircraft and automobile industries.

Lear grew during the 1980s and 1990s through a series of acquisitions. The company sought to become a supplier of complete interior automotive systems, that is, a supplier of seating, electrical, flooring, interior trim, instrument panels, etc., to original equipment manufacturing (OEM) auto companies.

== Inheritance of United Technologies Automotive ==
On March 16, 1999, Lear announced it would acquire United Technologies Automotive, a subsidiary of United Technologies Corporation that produced dashboards, electrical distribution systems, motors and air-flow parts, interior door panels and switches, for $2.3 billion. Lear announced on May 4, 1999, that it had completed the acquisition.

First Large Corporation to achieve ISO/TS 16949:1999 world wide in 280 global facilities, all of which was managed by Bill Cooper, Lear Corporation Global Quality Systems Senior Quality Manager.

=== Next Acquiring ===
On April 5, 2004, Lear announced it would pay $220 million for Wuppertal, Germany-based Grote & Hartmann, a maker of electrical components. On July 6, 2004, Lear announced it had completed the transaction.

=== Spinoff Assembling and interior systems division ===
As of late 2005, most OEM auto companies had indicated that they no longer wanted to purchase total interiors from any one company. As this was Lear's primary purpose in assembling those three divisions, and the interior systems division was not profitable, the company began seeking to get rid of this division.

=== Another extension and purchasing of the Interior System Department ===
In early 2007, Lear Corporation completed the transfer of substantially all of its former North American Interior Systems Division to International Automotive Components Group (IAC), a joint venture of Lear, WL Ross & Co., and Franklin Mutual Advisers. The deal involved 26 manufacturing plants and two Chinese joint ventures. Lear also contributed $27 million in cash for a 25 percent interest in IAC and warrants for an additional 7 percent.

Also in 2007, Lear's board of directors agreed to a $2.3 billion takeover offer from American Real Estate Partners, an affiliate of financier Carl Icahn, subject to shareholder approval. Lear has said it will continue to talk to other interested parties, however, Icahn would receive a $100 million fee should another offer be accepted. The deal was later voted down by shareholders.

=== Close to Bankruptcy ===
On July 2, 2009, Bloomberg News reported that Lear Corp. planned to file for Chapter 11 bankruptcy after reaching an agreement with representatives of secured lenders and bondholders. On November 9, 2009, Lear announced it had emerged from bankruptcy.

=== Simoncini becomes CEO ===
On August 10, 2011, Lear announced that senior vice president and chief financial officer Matt Simoncini had been elected chief executive officer and president, effective September 1, 2011.

=== PACE Award ===
In 2012, Automotive News awarded Lear a Premier Automotive Suppliers' Contribution to Excellence (PACE) Award for innovation, technological advancement and business performance for its Solid State Smart Junction Box (S3JB), noting Lear's "S3JB junction box has 1) integrated solid state fuse technology to eliminate relays, 2) created a new package that no longer has to be accessible from the driver compartment which decreases nuisance calls and lowers electrical device warranty returns, 3) created and installed a smart software logic with detailed diagnostics to permit a 'fail safe operation,' and 4) designed a single state board design with patented thermal aspects that permits multiple system and device connections and various configurations to ease manufacturing processes."

=== Takeover of Guilford Mills ===
Lear acquired automotive and specialty fabrics company Guilford Mills for $257 million in May 2012. In addition to automotive fabric applications, Guilford produces fabrics for markets including water filtration, window covering, performance apparel, medical and other industrial applications.

=== Acquisition of Eagle Ottawa LLC ===
In August 2014, it was announced that Lear Corp would acquire automotive leather supplier Eagle Ottawa LLC for a fee of $850 million.

=== Occasions 2015 ===
In May 2015 the company announced that it would open a new automotive plant in Gostivar, Republic of North Macedonia, in the summer of 2015. This was to be Lear's first facility in North Macedonia.

=== Agreement set for takeover Grupo Antolin ===
In February 2017 it was announced that Lear Corp signed a definitive agreement to acquire Grupo Antolin's automotive seating business. The transaction was valued at €286 million on a cash and debt free basis. Lear Corp funded the transaction with cash on hand.

=== Formula 1 Engagement ===
Lear held a backer for the Jaguar Racing Team in the 2001 Formula One World Championship and also now in the Formula E Competition.

=== Acquisition of InTouch Automation ===
In November 2022, it was announced Lear had acquired the Novi-based supplier of Industry 4.0 technologies and automated testing equipment used in the production of automotive seats, InTouch Automation.

== Operations ==
Lear's Seating division makes complete seats for vehicle manufacturers, along with parts such as frames, upholstery and cushioning. Its products also include seat heating, ventilation and massage systems. The company's other division, E-Systems, makes vehicle wiring, connectors and electronic controllers. In 2025, Seating generated sales of $17.3 billion and E-Systems $6.0 billion.

=== Manufacturing and development ===
At the end of 2025, Lear employed approximately 164,300 people and operated 258 facilities in 36 countries. These included factories assembling complete seats for just-in-time delivery. The company also manufactures automotive connectors and related components in Germany, the Czech Republic, Morocco, China and the US.

Lear's development network includes a technology centre at its headquarters in Southfield, Michigan. In Shanghai, it opened an Asian regional headquarters and product and technology centre in 2014, bringing together engineering, product development and validation. Its Moroccan operations include production and engineering sites in Rabat, Tangier, Kenitra and Meknes.

In the Czech Republic, Lear has manufacturing operations in Ostrov u Stříbra, Kolín and Vyškov. Its Plzeň development centre designs and tests automotive seats, while its Brno engineering centre develops fuse boxes, terminals and connectors.
