= Petri AG =

- Industry: Automotiveindustry; Plastic production
- Founded: Takata Shiga, Japan (1933); Petri Aschaffenburg, Germany (1899)
- Founder: Takezo Takada; Richard Petri
- Defunct: 2000
- Fate: Acquired by Takata Corporation (2000); Acquired by Key Safety Systems (2017)
- Successor: Joyson Safety Systems (2018-)
- Headquarters: Tokyo, Japan; Aschaffenburg (Bavaria), Germany,
- Area served: Worldwide
- Products: steering wheels Interior trims Airbagsystems; Seat belts Electronics; Child Restraint Systems
- Number of employees: 35,000 worldwide 11,000 in Europe
- Website: Joyson Safety Systems Aschaffenburg GmbH

Petri AG was an automotive parts company based in Germany. It was acquired by the Japanese company Takata Corporation in 2000, forming the European subsidiary Takata-Petri. In 2018, operations became part of the new Joyson Safety Systems as Joyson Safety Systems Aschaffenburg GmbH, after the 2017 bankruptcy of Takata and subsequent purchase by Key Safety Systems.

== History ==
Petri AG was founded in Aschaffenburg in 1899 by Richard Petri and started to produce steering wheels and interior trims. Richard Petri founded the first plant (Plant 01) in Aschaffenburg, which is now the European Headquarters of Takata-Petri. Later, Petri's firm expanded further and added other plants for the production of plastic parts, like the Plant 02 in Nilkheim, near Aschaffenburg and Plant 03 in Albertshausen, near Bad Kissingen. Steering wheel production is still located in Aschaffenburg. Other plastic components and interior trims are mostly produced in Albertshausen. Aside from these plants, Petri also founded some research and assembly plants later on. In 1981, Petri AG developed and produced the first airbag system in collaboration with Mercedes-Benz. In 2000, Japanese competitor Takata Corporation acquired Petri AG, forming the subsidiary Takata-Petri, renamed Takata AG in early 2012.

Takata AG was a global leader in the production of steering wheels and plastic parts, not only in the automotive industry. After the 2017 Takata bankruptcy, the major assets were acquired by Key Safety Systems which was renamed in 2018 to Joyson Safety Systems.
