= Jeep Grand Cherokee (WJ) =

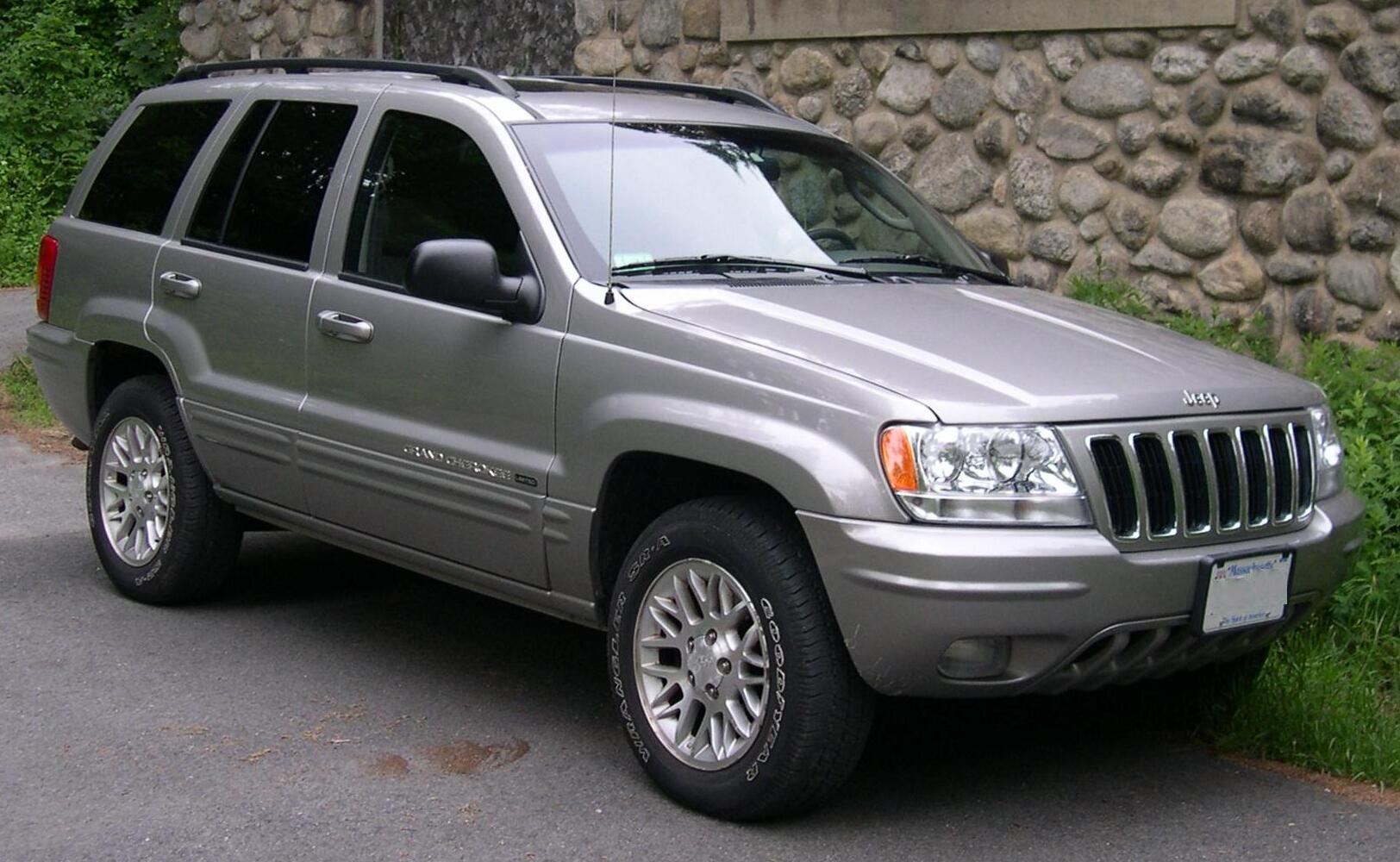

Overview
- Manufacturer: Jeep (DaimlerChrysler)
- Also called: Beijing Jeep 4000 (4.0 L I6) or Beijing Jeep 4700 (4.7 L V8) (in China)
- Production: July 17, 1998–May 21, 2004 (North America); 1999–2005 (Europe); 2004–2005 (China)
- Model years: 1999–2004 (North America); 2000–2005 (Europe)
- Assembly: Detroit, Michigan, United States (JNAP); Graz, Austria (Magna Steyr); Córdoba, Argentina; Valencia, Venezuela (Carabobo Assembly); Beijing, China (Beijing Jeep)
- Designer: Tom Gale, Brandon Faroute (1995)

Body and chassis
- Layout: Front-engine, rear-wheel drive or four-wheel drive
- Related: Jeep Liberty; Jeep Wrangler

Powertrain
- Engine: 4.0 L AMC 242 I6; 4.7 L Chrysler PowerTech V8; 4.7 L Chrysler PowerTech HO V8; 3.1 L VM Motori 531 OHV TD I5; 2.7 L Mercedes-Benz OM612 Turbo CRD I5; China; 4.0 L C698QA1 I6; 4.7 L C8V93Q V8
- Transmission: 4-speed 42RE automatic 4-speed 45RFE automatic 5-speed 545RFE automatic

Dimensions
- Wheelbase: 105.9 in (2,690 mm)
- Length: 1999–2000: 181.5 in (4,610 mm); 2001-03: 181.6 in (4,613 mm); 2004: 181.3 in (4,605 mm)
- Width: 1999–2000 & 2004: 72.3 in (1,836 mm); 2001–03: 72.6 in (1,844 mm)
- Height: 1999–2000 & 2004: 69.4 in (1,763 mm); 2001–03: 70.3 in (1,786 mm)
- Curb weight: Laredo 2WD (4.0) 3,786 lb (1,717 kg) Laredo 2WD (4.7) 3,863 lb (1,752 kg); Limited 2WD (4.0) 3,895 lb (1,767 kg); Limited 2WD (4.7) 3,964 lb (1,798 kg); Limited 2WD (4.7 H.O.) 3,999 lb (1,814 kg); Laredo 4WD (4.0) 3,970 lb (1,801 kg); Laredo 4WD (4.7) 4,041 lb (1,833 kg); Limited 4WD (4.0) 4,072 lb (1,847 kg); Limited 4WD (4.7) 4,147 lb (1,881 kg); Limited 4WD (4.7 H.O.) 4,206 lb (1,908 kg) Overland 4WD (4.7 H.O.) 4,364 lb (1,979 kg)

Chronology
- Predecessor: Grand Cherokee ZJ
- Successor: Grand Cherokee WK; Jeep Commander (XK)

The Jeep Grand Cherokee (WJ) is the second generation of the Jeep Grand Cherokee sport utility vehicle. Unveiled in Detroit, Michigan, on June 16, 1998, production lasted until 2004 in the US, continuing in foreign markets until 2005. The WJ was completely overhauled from its ZJ predecessor and was renowned for its off-road capability. Jeep marketed the (WJ) as "the most capable SUV ever."

== Background ==
Unveiled at Detroit, MI Cobo Hall on June 16, 1998, the redesigned WJ 1999 Grand Cherokee shared just 127 parts with its predecessor (mostly fasteners) and took 28 months to develop from its March 1996 design freeze (styling approval in Q3 1995). The spare tire was relocated from the side of the cargo compartment to under the floor. The two heavy pushrod V8 engines were replaced by Chrysler's then-new PowerTech. The new V8 engine produced less torque than the old pushrods, but was lighter, offered better fuel economy, and provided similar on-road performance figures (the 23-gallon fuel tank was replaced with one of a 20.5-gallon capacity). The Inline 6 engine was also updated for MY1999. A redesign of the intake manifold added 10 horsepower (7.5 kW). While other Jeep vehicles used the Mopar 5 x 4.5 bolt circle, this was the first Jeep following the 1987 Chrysler buyout to receive a wider wheel bolt pattern: – 5 x 5 - (metric 5 x 127mm).

A notable feature available in this generation was the automatic four-wheel-drive option called Quadra-Drive, which employed the New Venture Gear NV247 transfer case. This two-speed chain-driven transfer case uses a gerotor, a clutch pack coupled to a hydraulic pump, to transfer torque between the front and rear axles. The transfer case contains three modes: 4-All Time, Neutral, and 4-Lo. In 4-All Time, 100% of torque is sent to the rear axle in normal conditions. If the rear axle starts spinning at a higher rate than the front axle, hydraulic pressure builds up in the gerotor and causes the clutch pack to progressively transfer torque to the front axle until both axles return to the same speed. Neutral mode is intended for towing the vehicle. In 4-Lo, the front and rear axles are locked together through a 2.72 reduction gear ratio. The NV247 transfer case is mated to front and rear axles containing Jeep's Vari-Lok differentials. Vari-Lok differentials also use a gerotor to transfer torque between the wheels on either side of the axle. The major advantage of Quadra-Drive was that the combined transfer case and progressive locking differentials in each axle could automatically control traction between all four wheels. However, only the center differential could be permanently locked, and only in 4Lo. The Quadra-Trac II system included the NV247 transfer case with the standard open front and rear differentials.

The 45RFE and 545RFE automatic transmission in the WJ was notable. It included three planetary gear sets rather than the two normally used in a four-speed automatic. This gave it six theoretical speeds, and it would have been the first six-speed transmission ever produced in volume, but it was programmed to only use five of these ratios. Four were used for upshifts, with a different second gear for downshifts. Although five of the six ratios were used, Chrysler decided to call it a "4-speed automatic". In 2001, the programming was changed to make use of all six ratios. Rather than have six forward gears, the transmission was programmed to act as a five-speed with the alternate second gear for downshifts. The rpm at 70 miles per hour (113 km/h) on a 545RFE is 2000 rpm, 200 rpm less than the 45RFE programming. 1999 and 2000 model year WJ owners can have their 45RFE transmission's programming flashed to enable the extra gear, as both transmissions are physically the same. The 42RE 4-speed automatic remained the transmission for the Inline 6 engine. It had slight changes from the previous model Grand Cherokee.

The interior was also completely redesigned. The redesign allowed for larger rear doors and more space for rear passengers. Controls for various items like headlights, heated seats, and rear wipers were moved to more convenient locations. The electronic Vehicle Information Center was moved from below the radio to above the windshield, and was standard on all 2000 and up models. Limited models included automatic dual-zone climate control. A CD-changer with capacity for 10 CDs was also available with the Infinity Audio package.

In addition to Jeep's UniFrame construction, Daimler Chrysler partnered with Porsche to further strengthen the frame. This was done to reduce noise, vibration, and harshness (NVH). UniFrame is an unusual construction scheme; it incorporates all of the strength and durability of a body-on-frame construction into a unitized construction. By adding stiffness and rigidity to the structure, they enhanced the ride and strengthened the network of steel beams, rails, and pillars (or "safety cage") that surround and protect occupants. More than 70 percent of the underbody is high-strength steel. All Jeep Grand Cherokees feature UniFrame construction.

The Grand Cherokee received a secondary minor facelift for 2004, including round fog lamps, a lower front fascia, and a new body-color matched inset grille design.

Export models produced at the plant in Graz, Austria, were given the vehicle designation of "WG", which feature minor differences from the US model, including a relocated radio antenna (moved from front right fender to integrated on rear passenger side window), power folding mirrors, height adjustable headlights, plastic rocker covers on Limited trim models (only available on Laredo trim on US models), as well as leather shift knobs on Overland trim models. Chrysler also claims the vehicle received other improvements to reduce "NVH". "WG" models were also manufactured at the Cordoba plant for the Argentinian market.

== New features ==
The first-generation Jeep Grand Cherokee (ZJ) offered many new and class-exclusive features, and the second-generation Jeep Grand Cherokee WJ continued to offer new features that were not yet available on its competitors, such as the Chevrolet Blazer and Ford Explorer.

At the time of its release, the all-new 1999 Jeep Grand Cherokee WJ had many standard and optional features that were class-exclusive. HomeLink allowed the driver to program up to three devices, such as garage door openers, estate gates, and other controlled access devices, and operate those devices with buttons located in the overhead console. A state-of-the-art automatic dual-zone climate control system used infrared sensors located in the climate control panel to monitor the surface temperature of both driver and front passenger to automatically control the interior temperature for both front passengers. The Jeep Memory System allowed for two drivers to set their individual driver's seat, side mirror, and radio setting by using buttons located on the front driver's door interior panel to recall their preferred settings at the touch of a button, or upon insertion of the corresponding key into the ignition (the keyless entry remotes were color-coded either black or gray, and had either a '1' or '2' on the back of the remote to help the drivers easily identify their remote).

For the 2002 model year, the Grand Cherokee WJ received its first mid-cycle refresh. This included the introduction of three new models: a value-oriented Sport, the Laredo-based Special Edition, and the new range-topping Overland. A new 4.7L High-Output Power Tech V8 gasoline engine became available on Limited models, and was standard on Overland. All models receive new radios, which included a standard A/M-F/M stereo radio with a single-disc CD player on Laredo and Limited, with an A/M-F/M stereo radio with Radio Data System (RDS) and cassette and single-disc CD players standard on Overland and optional on all other models (both radios featured standard CD changer controls for the optional ten-disc remote CD changer in the rear cargo area). For vehicles equipped with the Infinity Gold premium audio system, the 'Infinity Gold' emblem was removed from the front door speaker grilles, and the Laredo no longer featured carpeted front and rear door panels. Also on the interior, all models received a new chrome 'Jeep' steering wheel emblem, as well as new interior accent trim (faux aluminum on Sport, Laredo, and Special Edition, and faux woodgrain on all other models). Sport and Laredo models received new "Landscape"/"Millennium" cloth seat fabric as standard equipment, and Limited models received new "Royale" leather seat trim (the previously available "Royale" leather seat trim remained available on Sport, Laredo, and Special Edition models). A new front grille and headlamps were introduced on Limited models, new tire and wheel combinations were available for all models, and in midyear 2002, a full-color GPS navigation radio with a single-disc CD player and ten-disc remote CD changer became available on Limited and Overland models. All radios supported dealer-installed accessory Sirius Satellite Radio and U Connect hands-free Bluetooth phone system. To round out the changes for 2002, a full-size spare tire and wheel was now standard equipment on all models, front side-impact airbags and power-adjustable foot pedals were available (the Vehicle Identification Number differentiated between frontal airbags only and frontal and front side-impact airbags with the characters '4' and '8' respectively as the third digit) and center roof rack cross rails were now only available as a dealer-installed accessory for all models.

A second exterior facelift was introduced for the 2004 model year, and included revised front grilles and fascias (bumpers) for all models (Laredo models also received newly styled round front fog lamps as an optional feature). The Laredo-based Special Edition model rejoined the lineup, and a new Columbia Edition model (also based on the Laredo) was introduced. The base Laredo model was now only available with the base "E" Package, and included fewer standard features (including the deletion of carpeted front and rear floor mat and rear cargo area tonneau cover). Production of the Grand Cherokee WJ ended in mid-2004, as the all-new third-generation Jeep Grand Cherokee (WK) was introduced, and the Jefferson North Assembly Plant received a retooling for production of the all-new model. All 2004 models equipped with four wheel drive received Jeep's "Trail Rated 4X4" certification, and an emblem on the front left fender.

== Yearly changes ==
1999 - 1999 saw the introduction of the all-new, second-generation Jeep Grand Cherokee WJ. While similar in dimensions and style to the first-generation Jeep Grand Cherokee (ZJ), the WJ Grand Cherokee featured a more modern exterior design and an all-new interior. While the 4.0L "Power-Tech" Inline Six-Cylinder (I6) engine and 42RE four-speed automatic transmission both carried over from the previous-generation model, the previous 5.2L "Magnum" V8 engine was replaced by an all-new 4.7L "Power-Tech" V8 engine, which was mated to the all-new 45RFE four-speed automatic transmission (the 5.9L "Magnum" V8 engine was dropped after the 1998 model year). The spare tire and wheel were relocated from the left side of the rear cargo area to underneath the cargo floor. This decreased on available cargo space, but made it easier to access the spare tire and wheel.

2000 - Having been fully redesigned for the 1999 model year, the 2000 Jeep Grand Cherokee received minimal changes. However, the 4.7L "Power-Tech" V8 engine's 45RFE four-speed automatic transmission was replaced by the 545RFE five-speed automatic transmission. Finally, the base Laredo "D" Package was discontinued, which meant that the Laredo model now included the Electronic Vehicle Information Center (EVIC) with an overhead console as standard equipment.

2001 - For 2001, a 60th Anniversary Edition Jeep Grand Cherokee, based on the Limited model, celebrated the Brand's sixtieth anniversary. A new New England Edition Package for the base Laredo added seventeen-inch tires and "Silverblade" aluminum-alloy wheels, a combination A/M-F/M stereo radio with cassette and CD players, and a power-adjustable front driver's seat to the base model. Another new package for the Laredo included the same feature content, but also added "Royale" leather-trimmed seating surfaces and an Infinity Gold premium audio system with a 180-watt amplifier. All models of the Grand Cherokee received new aluminum-alloy wheel options, and the Limited trim received new leather seating surfaces and revised burl rosewood interior trim (the Laredo model received simulated brushed aluminum interior trim and now included a trim bezel around the radio). The steering wheel on all models also received a silver-finished 'Jeep' emblem.

2002 - For 2002, the Grand Cherokee WJ received a major refresh, which introduced new features and models to the range, as well as minor changes related to cost-cutting measures. To start, an all-new Jeep Grand Cherokee Overland model was introduced, as a new model positioned above the previously top Limited model, including features such as extended leather seating surfaces and door panels, an Infinity Gold premium amplified audio system, as well as a genuine wood-trimmed interior and steering wheel.

The Laredo trim now included a six-way, power-adjustable front driver's seat and an A/M-F/M stereo radio with a single-disc CD player a standard equipment, as well as revised seat fabrics and new "Silverblade" aluminum-alloy wheels. Midyear, a new Special Edition model was introduced based on the Laredo model that added color-keyed front and rear bumpers and body side cladding, an Infinity Gold 180-watt premium amplified audio system, and unique badging on the front doors of the vehicle. A new "High Output" 4.7L "Power-Tech" V8 engine became available, standard on Overland, and optional on Limited. All radios (aside from the base "RBK" A/M-F/M stereo radio) now included Radio Data System (RDS) capabilities, and side-impact airbags were now an option on all models.

2003 - For 2003, the Jeep Grand Cherokee gained a new "Freedom Edition" model, based on the Laredo trim, while the Sport model was discontinued. The Laredo model now included high-back front bucket seats with integrated headrests as standard equipment, with low-back front bucket seats with separate headrests becoming an option (the low-back bucket seats were standard when the Laredo trim was ordered with the optional "Royale" leather-trimmed seating surfaces). New entertainment options, including a GPS navigation system, radio, and Sirius Satellite Radio were offered for the first time. The Special Edition model was temporarily discontinued for the 2003 model year, but would reappear for 2004. 2003 was a shortened model year, with 2004 model year production commencing in mid-2003. During this year, the WJ also received two minor changes during the model year, including the change from a functional oil pressure gauge to a "dummy" gauge (only showing if oil pressure is present or not), as well as changing from a hollow to a solid front sway bar starting on vehicles made after November 7, 2002, onwards.

2004 - 2004 would mark the Jeep Grand Cherokee WJ's final model year of production. There was a new Columbia Edition model that was introduced as a partnership between Jeep and Columbia Sportswear, and included unique seat trim, larger aluminum-alloy wheels, and a complimentary Columbia parka (the Special Edition trim would also reappear for the 2004 model year). The Laredo trim was condensed to a single "E" Package, though all previously available options were still available. All models received revised front fascias for 2004, and all four wheel drive models received Jeep's new "Trail Rated 4X4" certification. This certification could typically be identified by the badge placed on the front driver's side fender; however, many Grand Cherokees did not receive the badge, despite being certified as “Trail Rated.” Production concluded in April 2004, with the all-new Jeep Grand Cherokee (WK) being introduced in the same month at the New York International Auto Show.

== Models ==
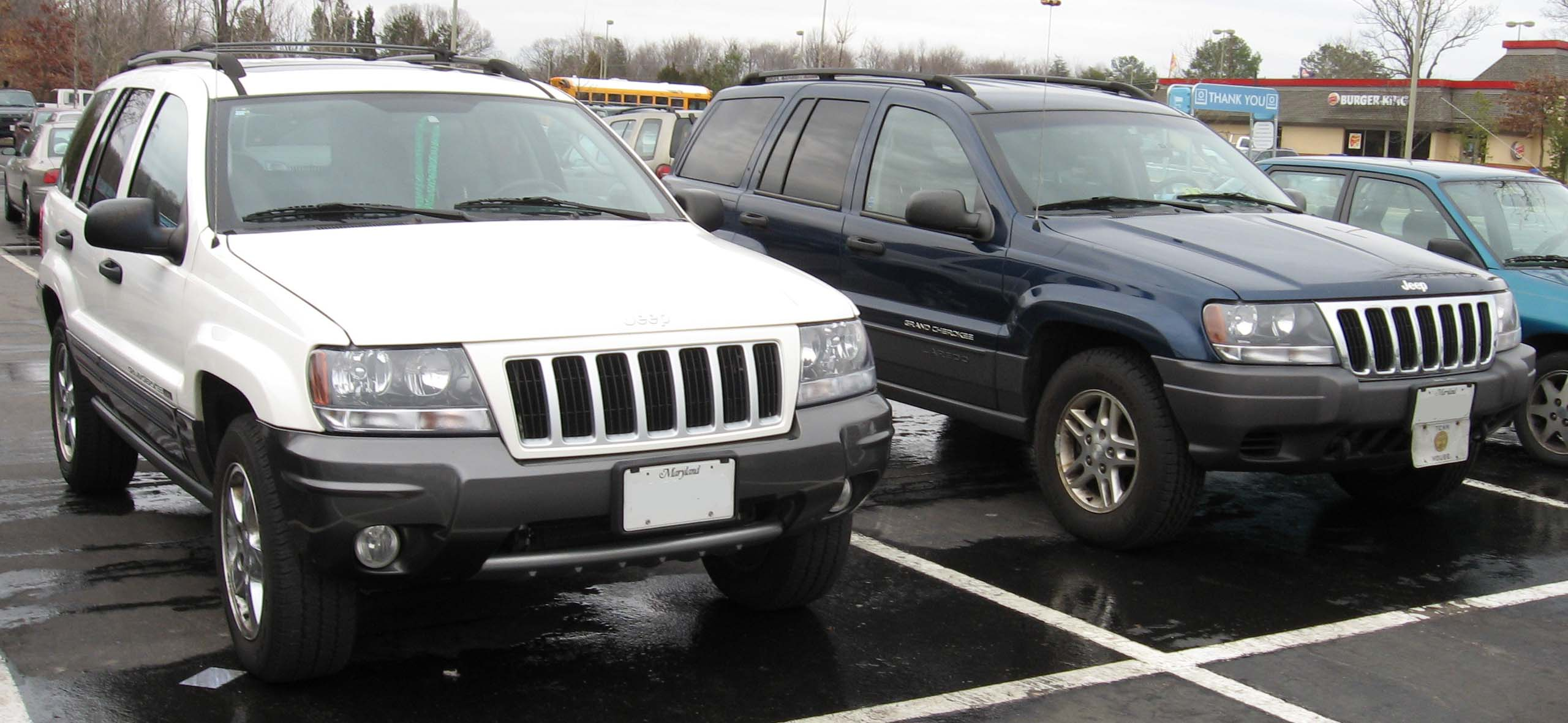
Pre- and post-facelifted WJ Grand Cherokees, right and left respectively

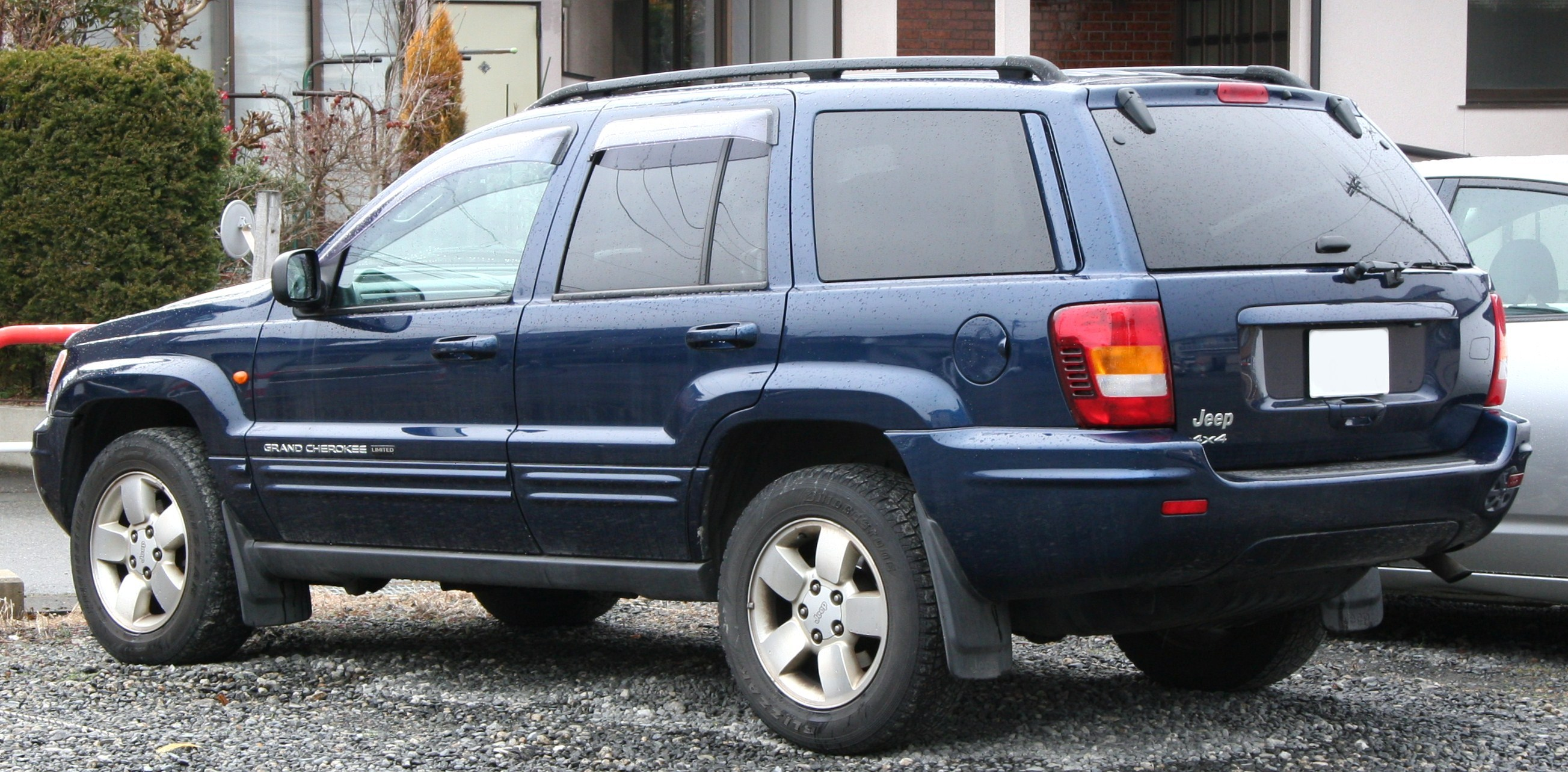
Jeep Grand Cherokee Limited

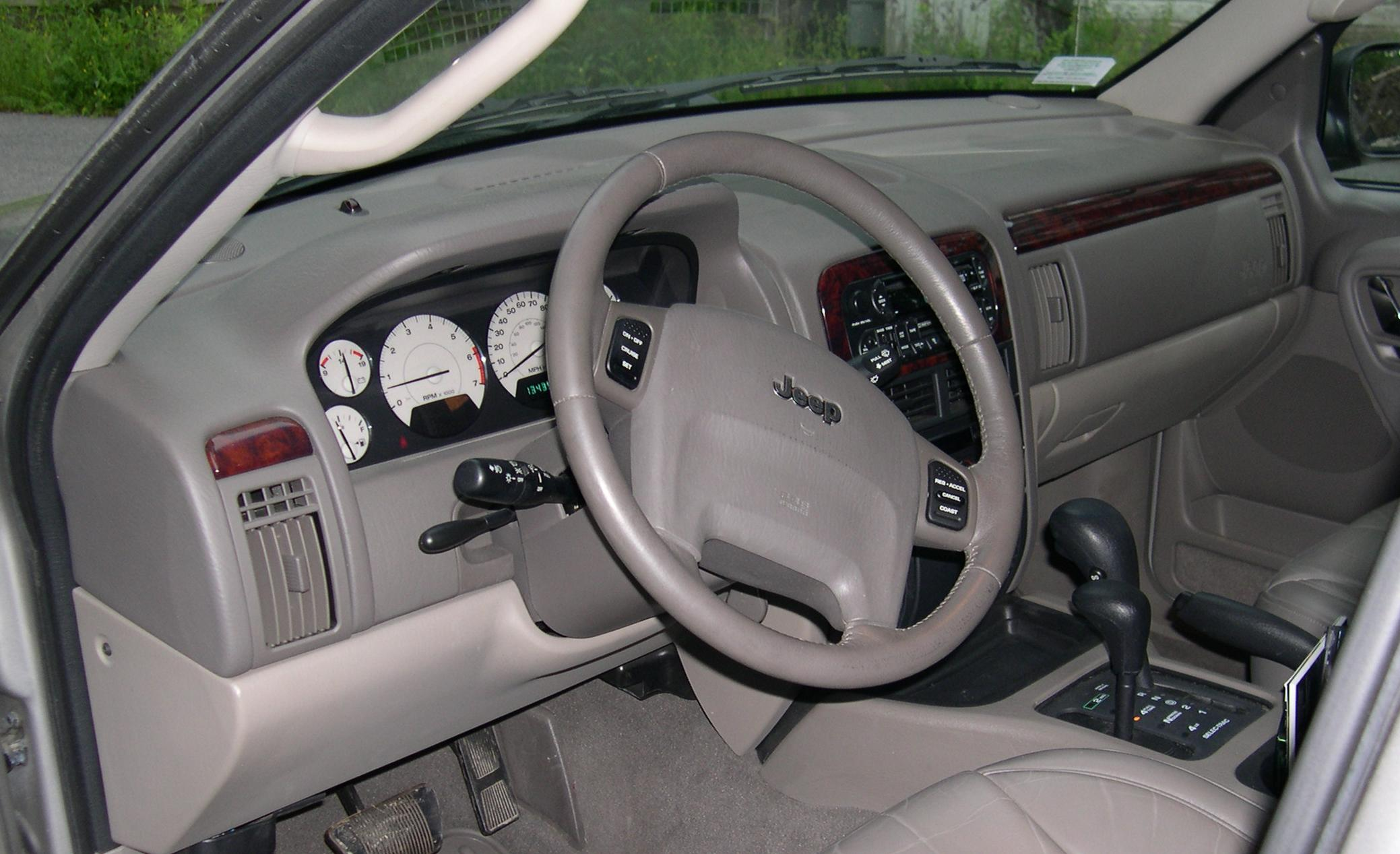
Dashboard

The Laredo served as the base Grand Cherokee trim level from August 1998 to 2004, and still continues to be the base Grand Cherokee trim level to this day. The Laredo offered these features as standard equipment: the 4.0L Power-Tech I6 engine, a four-speed automatic transmission, sixteen-inch alloy wheels, an AM/FM stereo with cassette and CD player (1998-2001) or CD players (2001-2004), wood interior trim (1998-2000) or aluminum interior trim (2000-2004), keyless entry, power windows and door locks, cloth seating surfaces, air conditioning, a split-folding 60/40 rear bench seat, gray-painted front and rear bumpers and body-side cladding trim panels, and more. After MY1999, the Laredo 26D Package was dropped, leaving the Laredo 26E/28E Packages as the base Grand Cherokee packages, and adding a standard overhead Electronic Vehicle Information Center (EVIC/VIC) and overhead console. Many features that were available on the luxurious Limited trim could also be optioned on the base Laredo trim. For 2001 only, a New England Special Group was available for Grand Cherokees equipped with the 26E Package. The package, which was indicated by the sales code ACJ, added features to the base model Grand Cherokee such as P235/65R17 BSW all-season performance tires, seventeen-inch sport alloy wheels (both options of which were also available with the 26S and 28S Packages), an AM/FM stereo with cassette and CD players with integrated remote CD changer controls, and a 3.73 rear axle ratio. The New England Special Group was available exclusively in select Northeastern states.

The Limited served as the top-of-the-line Grand Cherokee trim level from 1998 to 2001, and the more "luxurious" Grand Cherokee trim level from 2001 to 2004. It added these features: color-keyed body-side trim cladding panels and front and rear bumpers, a premium 180-watt Infinity Gold stereo system with six speakers, leather seating surfaces, dual power front bucket seats, a full-sized spare tire and spare wheel, a security alarm, a leather-wrapped steering wheel, steering wheel-mounted remote audio system controls, driver's two-position memory (color-coded keyless entry remotes), wood interior trim, and more.

The Sport was the lowest-priced trim level of the Grand Cherokee was introduced in November 2001, for MY2002. Offered only for 2002, the Sport was aimed at value-oriented customers who wanted a very well-equipped vehicle at a modest price point. It added these features to the base Laredo trim: dual power front heated bucket seats, leather seating surfaces, an AM/FM stereo with cassette and CD players, a 180-watt Infinity Gold audio system with six speakers, a full-sized spare tire and spare wheel, a 'sport' emblem on the tailgate, a security alarm, a power sunroof, and more. Cloth seating surfaces, deleted heated front bucket seats, a deleted cassette player, and a deleted sunroof could be had for credit in place of the standard options they replaced.

The Special Edition was a value-oriented trim level of the Grand Cherokee in 2002 and in 2004 (the model was put on hiatus for the 2003 model year). Based on the base Laredo trim, the Special Edition added these features: a full-sized spare tire/wheel, heated power dual front bucket seats, leather seating surfaces, and leather-wrapped steering wheel, an AM/FM stereo with cassette, CD player, ten disc rear mounted CD changer, color-keyed body-side cladding panels and front and rear bumpers, a security alarm, power sunroof, 180-watt Infinity Gold audio system and 'Special Edition' emblems on both front doors.

The Freedom was a value-oriented trim level of the Grand Cherokee between March 2003 (SOP 2003/03/10) and 2004. Based on the base Laredo trim, the Freedom added these features: a full-sized spare tire and spare wheel, seventeen-inch graphite-finish alloy wheels, unique cloth seating surfaces, dual power front bucket seats, an AM/FM stereo with cassette and CD players, a 180-watt Infinity Gold audio system with six speakers, and 'Freedom' emblems on both front doors.

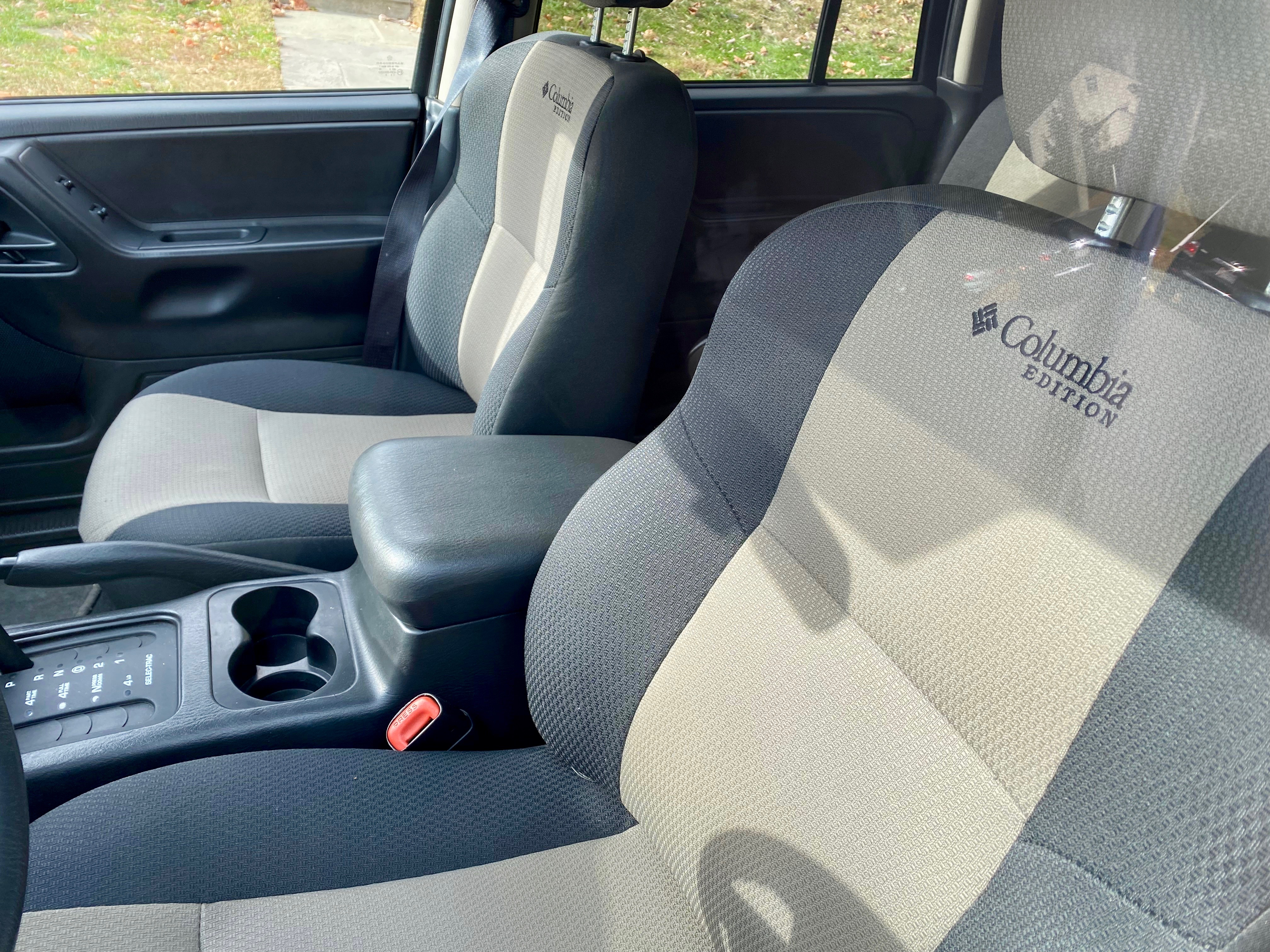
2004 Columbia Edition interior

The Columbia Edition, launched in November 2003 (2003/10/06 SOP) was a partnership between Jeep and sportswear manufacturer Columbia for MY2004. Based on the base Laredo trim, the Columbia Edition added these features: a full-sized spare tire and spare wheel, seventeen-inch alloy wheels, unique two-toned cloth seating surfaces, dual power front bucket seats, an AM/FM stereo with cassette and CD players, a premium 180-watt Infinity Gold audio system with six speakers, Bright Silver Metallic-painted body-side cladding panels and front and rear bumpers, and 'Columbia Edition' emblems on both front doors. Columbia Edition buyers also received a complimentary Columbia "Bugaboo" parka when their new vehicle was delivered.

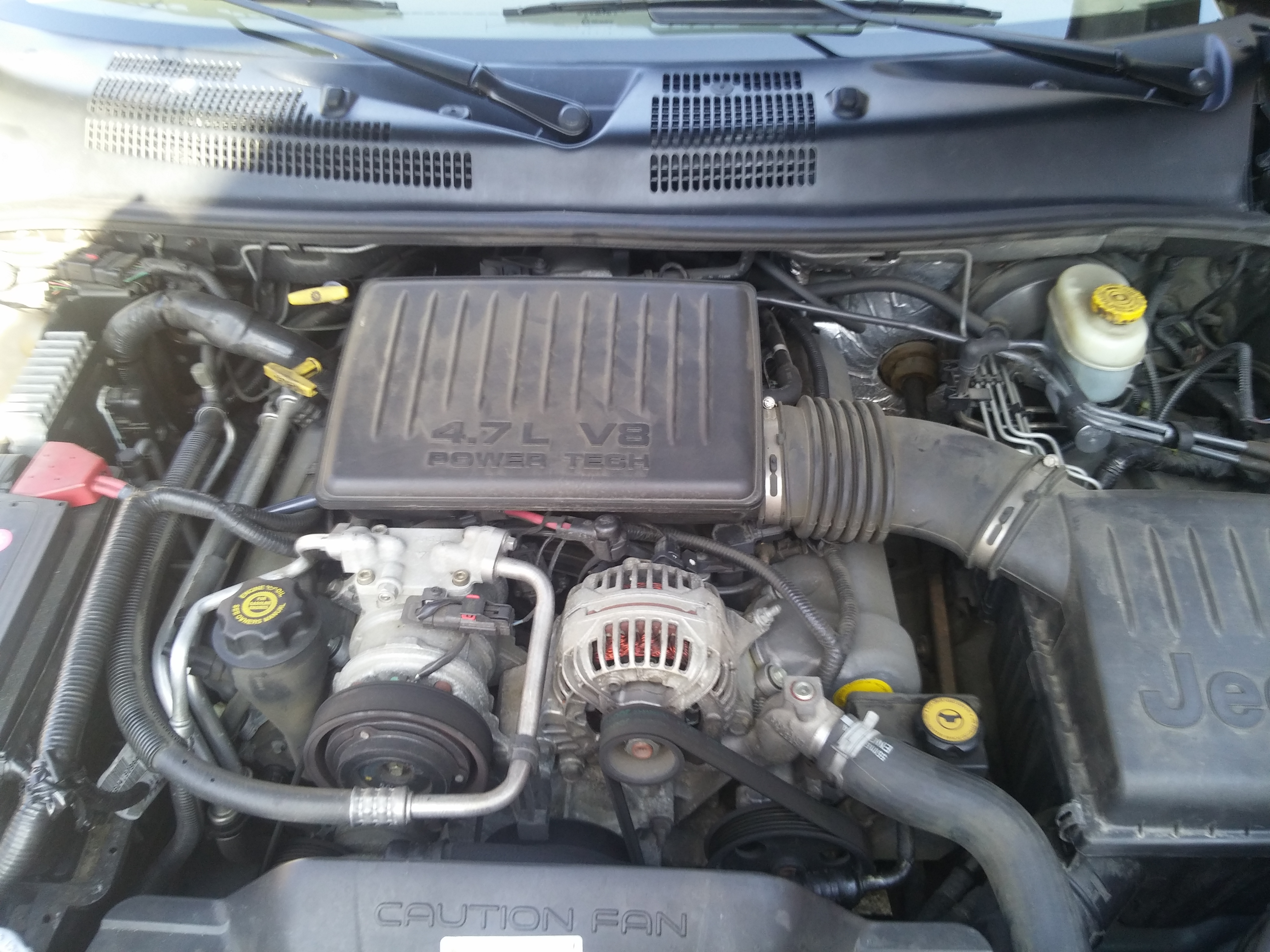
4.7 V8 Powertech engine Jeep WJ

The Overland was the top-of-the-line Grand Cherokee trim level between August 2001 and 2004, first introduced for MY2002. It added these features to the already-luxurious Limited trim level: an A/M-F/M stereo with cassette and CD players, a ten-disc remote rear-mounted CD changer, unique leather-and-suede seating surfaces, woodgrain (real redwood) for upper half of steering wheel and interior accents, dual power heated front bucket seats, Overland floor mats, 'Overland' emblems on both front doors, side curtain air bags, rain sense wipers, rock rails, Up Country Suspension (option was deleted for the MY2004 starting Sept 2003) Skid Plate Group with chrome tow hooks, unique seventeen-inch chrome-plated alloy wheels with matching spare, a power sunroof, and the higher-output (265 hp) 4.7 L Power-Tech V8 engine, which could also be had on the Limited trim.

The 60th Anniversary Edition was manufactured to commemorate Jeep's 60th anniversary in 2001. It added these features to the luxurious Limited trim level: unique seventeen-inch "Rogue" chrome-plated alloy wheels, '60th Anniversary Edition' emblems on both upper front fenders, heated front bucket seats, a power sunroof, an AM/FM stereo with cassette and CD players, a matching spare wheel, '60th Anniversary Edition'-embroidered front bucket seats, along with special 60th Anniversary Edition floor mats.

== Chinese production ==
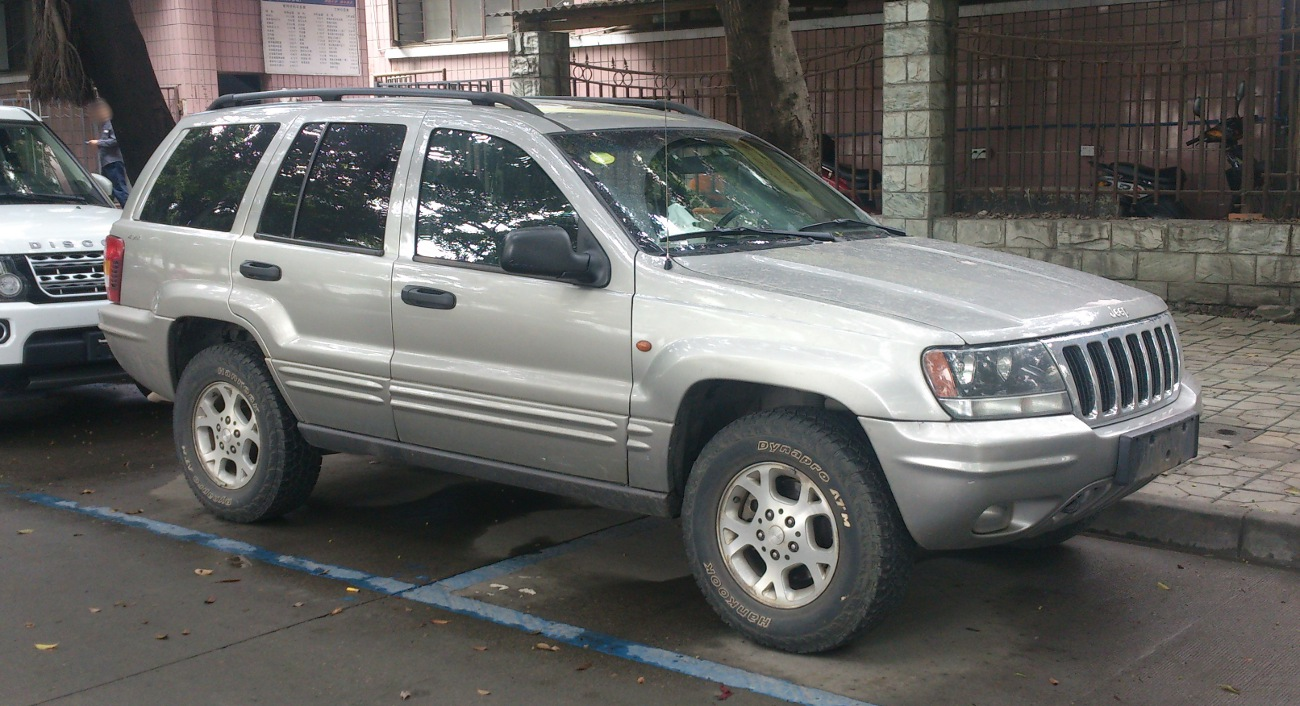
Beijing Jeep 4000 Grand Cherokee (China)

Beijing Jeep Corporation, Ltd. produced the XJ classic Cherokee from 1984 to 2005. Beijing Jeep bought the old tooling for the WJ Grand Cherokee when the WK was introduced for the U.S. as a 2005 model. The WJ was introduced at the end of 2004 for the Chinese market as the Jeep 4000 and 4700 Grand Cherokee and carries differing engine names compared to their foreign counterparts, known as C698QA1 for the 6 cylinder and C8V93Q for the V8. A 4-speed automatic gearbox was standard on the 6-cylinder, while the V8 had a 5-speed automatic gearbox. Pricing ranges from 358,000 and 496,000 yuan (53,480 to US$74,090) with four trim levels.

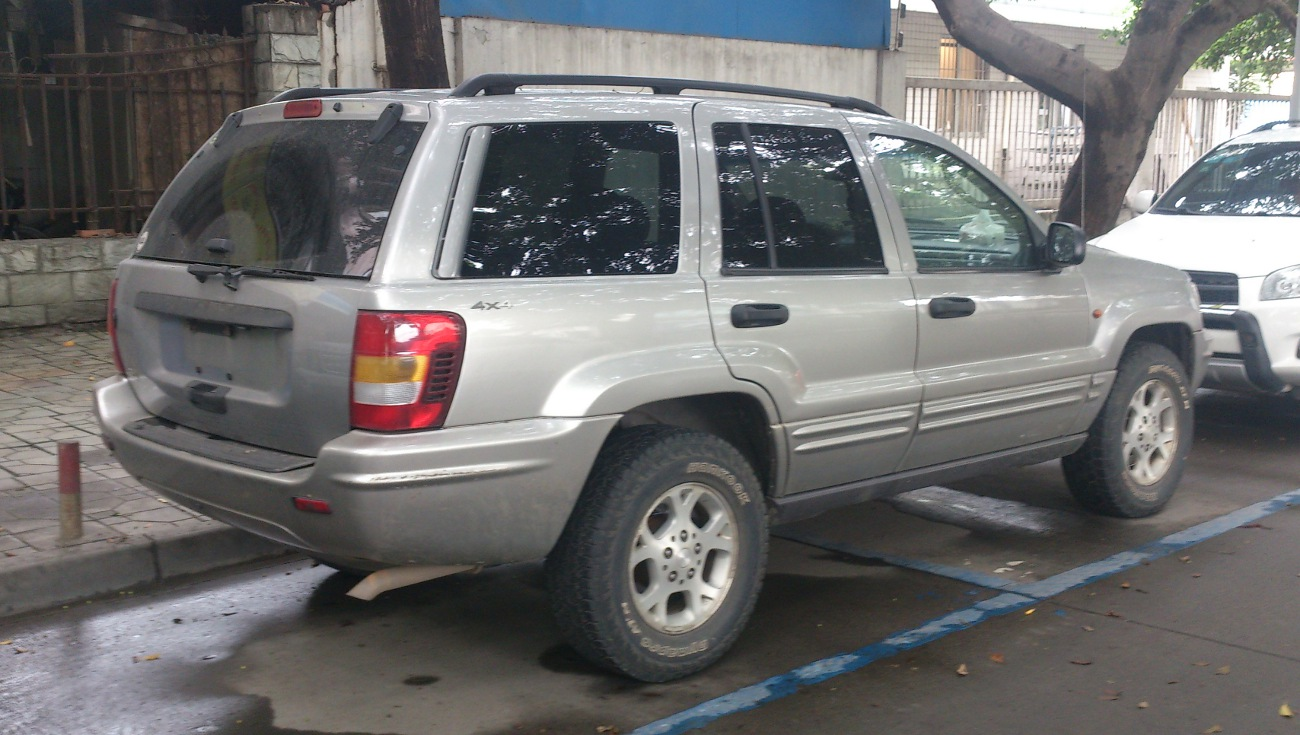
Beijing Jeep 4000 Grand Cherokee (Rear)

It was their flagship model and nearly identical to the 2004 Grand Cherokee Limited in looks and equipment, including the solid axle suspension, choice of 4WD systems, body color cladding, alloy wheels, Chrysler sound systems, and Chrysler automatic climate controls. This is unlike the XJ Cherokee, which was significantly modified by Beijing Jeep for the Chinese market.

== Engines ==
Years	Displacement	Engine	Power	Torque	Notes
1999–2004	4.0 L (242 CID)	Power Tech I6	195 hp (145 kW) @ 4600 rpm	230 lb⋅ft (312 N⋅m) @ 3000 rpm	Known as the C698QA1 in China. Produces 197 horsepower
1999–2004	4.7 L (287 CID)	PowerTech V8	235 hp (175 kW) @ 4800 rpm	295 lb⋅ft (400 N⋅m) @ 3200 rpm	Known as the C8V93Q in China. Produces 238 horsepower
2002–2004	4.7 L (287 CID)	High Output PowerTech V8	265 hp (198 kW) @ 5100 rpm	330 lb⋅ft (447 N⋅m) @ 3600 rpm	Limited, Overland and Freedom Edition only
1999–2001	3.1 L Diesel	531 OHV Diesel I5	138 hp (103 kW) @ 3600 rpm	283 lb⋅ft (384 N⋅m) @ 1800 rpm	Available in Europe, South Africa, and Mercosur/Mercosul
2002–2004	2.7 L Diesel	OM612 Turbo Diesel I5	161 hp (120 kW) @ 4000 rpm	295 lb⋅ft (400 N⋅m) 1800 - 2600 rpm	available in Europe, South Africa, Australia, Thailand, and Mercosur/ Mercosul

=== Detroit Diesel/VM Motori ===
The 3.1 liter turbo-diesel on the 1999 Grand Cherokee was developed in conjunction with Detroit Diesel/VM Motori. It has an electronic injection pump, electronically controlled, vacuum-actuated exhaust gas recirculation and a special catalyst to control oxides of nitrogen (NOx). It was manufactured in Cento, Italy, at 13,000 units per year. It was available in European models and met the European stage III emissions.

- Displacement: 3,124 cc (191 cu in)
- Power: 104 kW (141 PS; 139 bhp)
- Torque: 367 N⋅m (271 lb⋅ft)
- Transmission: Four-speed electronically controlled automatic

== Sales ==
The Jeep Grand Cherokee WJ and WG went into production on July 17, 1998, and finished its run on May 21, 2004.

Sales Figures Year over Year
Year	Sales	Notes
1998	62,880	Sold as 1999 models, includes pre-production run
1999	300,031	
2000	271,723	
2001	223,612	
2002	224,233	
2003	207,479	Short model year run
2004	182,313	
Total Sales	1,451,889	Data until November 2004

== Safety ==
=== Insurance Institute for Highway Safety (IIHS) ===
1999-2004 Grand Cherokee IIHS scores
Moderate overlap frontal offset	Marginal
Small overlap frontal offset	Not Tested
Side impact	Not Tested
Roof strength	Not Tested

=== NHTSA ===
1999-2004 Grand Cherokee NHTSA scores
Frontal Driver:	3/5 stars
Frontal Passenger:	3/5 stars
Side Driver:	4/5 stars
Side Passenger:	5/5 stars
4x2 Rollover:	*
4x4 Rollover:	*

*Note: Only 2001-2003 models rated

== Recalls ==
On November 8, 2012, Chrysler announced the recall of certain model years 2002 through 2004. A component in the air bag control module may fail, causing the front airbags, side curtain airbags, and/or seatbelt pretensioners to deploy inadvertently while the vehicle is being operated. Jeep Grand Cherokee vehicles manufactured February 13, 2001, through May 23, 2003.
