= HomeLink Wireless Control System =

Radio frequency transmitter

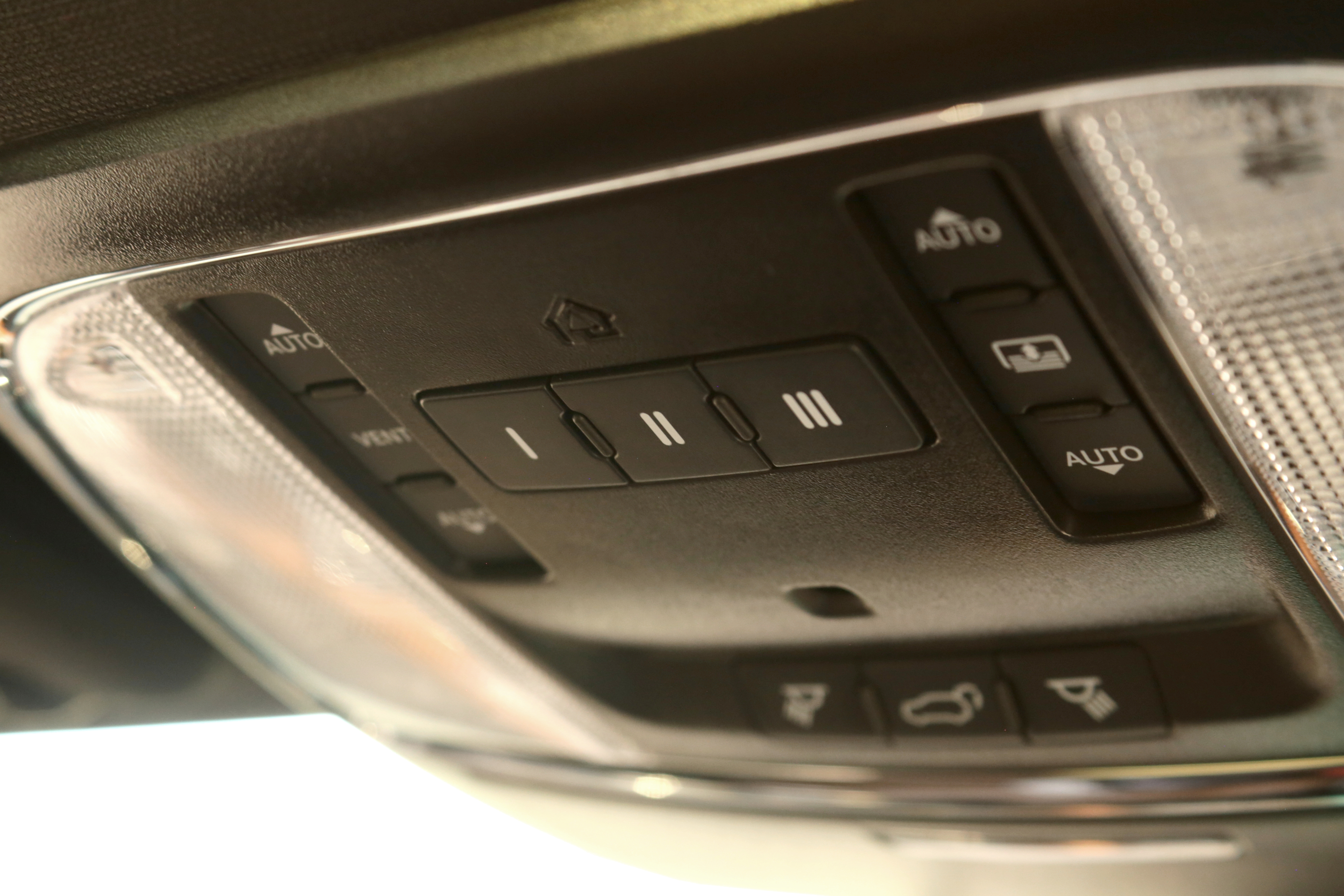
Overhead console with programmable HomeLink buttons

The HomeLink Wireless Control System is a radio frequency (RF) transmitter integrated into some automobiles that can be programmed to activate devices such as garage door openers, RF-controlled lighting, gates and locks, including those with rolling codes.

The system typically features three buttons, most often found on the driver-side visor or on the overhead console, which can be programmed via a training sequence to replace existing remote controls. It is compatible with most RF-controlled garage door openers, as well as home automation systems such as those based on the X10 protocol.

HomeLink is compatible with radio frequency devices operating between 288 and 433 MHz. Select 2007 and newer vehicles are compatible up to 433 MHz.

== History ==
HomeLink won the Automotive News PACE Award in 1997, for supplying automotive technology to improve consumer interaction between the car and the home.

By 2003, it had been installed on over 20,000,000 automobiles. Originally supplied by Johnson Controls, the HomeLink product line was sold to Gentex in 2013.
