= Dura Automotive Systems =

Auto parts supplier

DURA Automative Systems Logo

Dura Automotive Systems (shortened to Dura) is an independent designer and manufacturer of automotive components, including control systems, exterior systems and lightweight structural systems. Dura markets its automotive products to every North American, Asian and European original equipment manufacturers (OEMs) and many leading Tier 1 automotive suppliers. Dura is headquartered in Auburn Hills, Michigan, USA with more than 21,000 employees at 41 sites in 15 countries.

Dura was ranked in the 2006 Fortune 1000. Later that year, on October 30, 2006, Dura filed for Chapter 11 bankruptcy protection. Final determination to delist Dura's common stock and convertible trust preferred securities from NASDAQ was made November 13, 2006.

In December 2009, Dura Automotive Systems was acquired by Lynn Tilton through her New York-based private equity firm Patriarch Partners. In the deal, Dura absorbed Global Automotive Systems of suburban Detroit, also owned by Patriarch Partners, to form a parts supplier with global "sales of $1.6 billion and 10,800 employees in 39 manufacturing operations in 16 countries."

In October 2019, Dura Automotive Systems again filed for bankruptcy.
