= Takata Corporation =

Former Japanese automotive supplier

- Native name: タカタ株式会社
- Romanized name: Takata Kabushiki Gaisha
- Type: Public KK
- Industry: Automotive
- Founded: 1933 in Shiga Prefecture, Japan
- Founder: Takezo Takada
- Defunct: 11 April 2018; 8 years ago
- Fate: Bankruptcy, assets later acquired by Key Safety Systems
- Successor: Joyson Safety Systems
- Headquarters: Roppongi, Minato-ku, Tokyo, 106-8488, Japan
- Area served: Worldwide
- Key people: Shigehisa Takada (Chairman and CEO)
- Products: Airbag systems; Child-restraint systems; Electronics; Interior trims; Seat belts; Steering wheels
- Revenue: ▲¥ 718.003 billion (2016)
- Operating income: ▲¥ 42.133 billion (2016)
- Net income: ▲¥ -13.075 billion (2016)
- Number of employees: 50,530 (as of March 31, 2016)

Takata Corporation (タカタ株式会社, Takata Kabushiki Gaisha) was a Japanese automotive parts company. The company had production facilities on four continents, with its European headquarters located in Germany. In 2013, a series of deaths and injuries associated with defective Takata airbag inflators made in their Mexico plant led to a recall of 3.6 million cars equipped with Takata airbags. Further fatalities caused by the airbags led the National Highway Traffic Safety Administration (NHTSA) to order an ongoing, US-wide recall of more than 42 million cars, the largest automotive recall in U.S. history. (Note: Car owners potentially affected by the recall should check the NHTSA website for important information.) In June 2017, Takata filed for bankruptcy. It was acquired by Key Safety Systems. As of January 2024, over 100 million airbag inflators worldwide have been recalled by more than 20 carmakers.

== History ==
Takata was founded in 1933 in Shiga Prefecture, Japan, by Takezo Takada and started to produce lifelines for parachutes, and other textiles. In the early 1950s, the company started to research seat belts. In the 1960s, Takata started to sell seat belts and built Japan's first crash test plant for testing seat belts under real world conditions.

In the 1970s, Takata developed child restraint systems. In the 1980s the company changed its name to "Takata Corporation" and expanded internationally to Korea, the United States, and later to the United Kingdom, to sell seat belts.

In 2000, Takata Corporation acquired German competitor Petri AG, forming the European subsidiary Takata-Petri which was renamed Takata AG in early 2012. Takata AG produced steering wheels and plastic parts, not only for the automotive industry.

On June 25, 2017, Takata filed for Chapter 11 bankruptcy in the United States and filed for bankruptcy protection in Japan, owing more in compensation than was possible for its survival. Their remaining assets were sold to its largest competitor, Chinese owned and Michigan based Key Safety Systems, for about $1.6 billion. On April 11, 2018, following the completion of Key Safety Systems’ acquisition of Takata, the company announced that the company would be renamed to Joyson Safety Systems, and continue to operate in Michigan as Key Safety Systems.

The U.S. Chapter 11 proceedings of TK Holdings Inc. and its affiliates (Case No. 17-11375 ) were filed in the United States Bankruptcy Court for the District of Delaware before Judge Brendan Linehan Shannon. Weil, Gotshal & Manges LLP served as lead debtor's counsel, with Richards, Layton & Finger, P.A. as local Delaware counsel. The Official Committee of Unsecured Creditors was represented by Milbank, Tweed, Hadley & McCloy LLP, while a separate Tort Claimant Creditors' Committee was represented by Pachulski Stang Ziehl & Jones LLP. The proceedings involved complex product liability and personal injury claims arising from the airbag inflator defects, with firms such as Motley Rice, Brown Rudnick LLP, Beasley Allen Law Firm, Mark Roher Law of South Florida, P.A., and Sotos LLP representing individual claimants and creditor groups across multiple jurisdictions.

== Recalls ==
=== 1995 recall ===
In May 1995, a recall in the U.S. affecting 8.333 million predominantly Japanese built vehicles made from 1986 to 1991 with seat belts manufactured by the Takata Corporation of Japan, was issued. It was called at the time the "second largest recall in the 30-year history of the Department of Transportation (DOT)". The recall was prompted by an investigation (PE94-052) carried out by the NHTSA on Honda vehicles, after owners reported seat belt buckles either failing to latch, latching and releasing automatically, or releasing in accidents. It revealed that potentially faulty Takata seat belts were not limited only to Honda vehicles, but to other Japanese imports as well.

The NHTSA started a second investigation (EA94-036) on Takata seatbelts broadly as well as individual investigations on the vehicle manufacturers using Takata seat belts to determine the magnitude of the defect. This second investigation was only limited to the front seat belt buckles and in particular Takata's 52X and A7X models. This determined that a total of 11 manufacturers were affected by the investigation.

Japanese models sold in the United States by Honda, Isuzu, Mazda, Nissan, Daihatsu, Mitsubishi and Subaru also had affected seat belt buckles.

Moreover, Chrysler, General Motors and Ford all had various models manufactured by Japanese companies with the affected seat belt buckles, but sold under American names such as the Dodge Stealth and the Geo series (except Prizm) under General Motors.

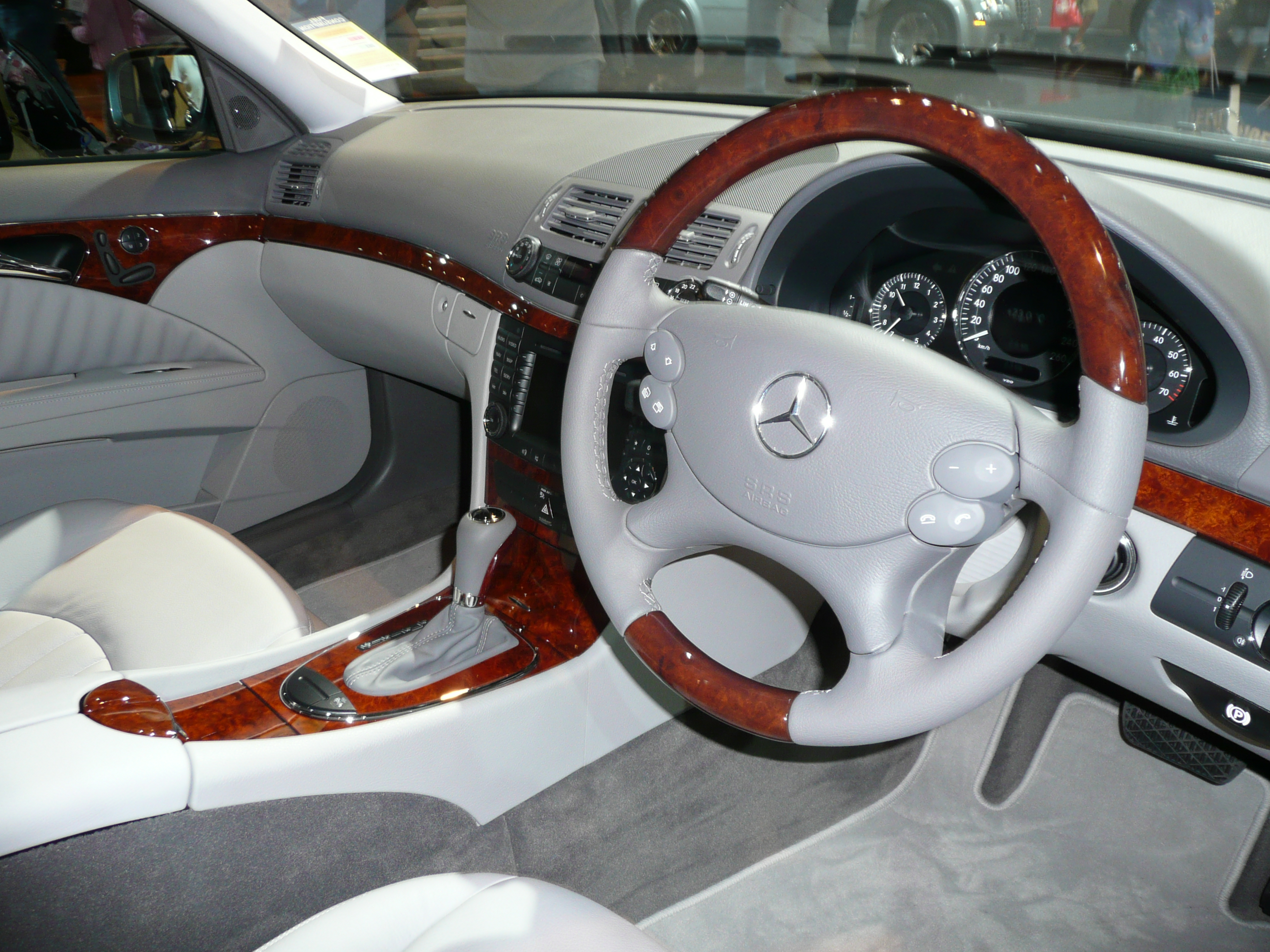
Steering-wheel in a Mercedes-Benz E-Class with Takata airbag

Ford had vehicles such as the Probe manufactured by Mazda on its MX-6 platform and the Festiva produced by Kia in South Korea, but engineered by Mazda that also had the seat belts. However, unlike Chrysler and General Motors, Ford did not admit that their seat belts could be defective.

Initially, some Japanese manufacturers suspected that the seat belt failures were a result of user abuse, rather than a design failure; however, the nine-month investigation by the NHTSA concluded that the cause of the defect was that the buckles were made of ABS plastic. Through exposure to ultraviolet light over a period of time, the plastic became brittle and pieces fell off, causing a jamming of the release button mechanism.

The manufacturers involved agreed to a voluntary recall, though this did not go smoothly. Only 18% of the 8.9 million cars and trucks with the Takata belt buckle were repaired two years after the recall had begun. In addition, the NHTSA assessed a $50,000 civil penalty against both Honda and Takata for failing to notify the agency about the seat belt defect in a timely manner. Honda was fined because the NHTSA believed the company knew about the hazard at least five years before the recall, but never reported the problem to the NHTSA, nor offered to conduct a voluntary recall.

=== Defective airbag recalls (2013–present) ===
Takata began making airbags in 1988 and by 2014, held 20 percent of the market. During 2013, several automakers began large recalls of vehicles due to Takata-made airbags. Reports state that the problems may have begun a decade before, with the faulty airbags placed in some Honda models starting in 1998. Honda stated they knew of more than 100 injuries and thirteen deaths (seven in the United States and six in Malaysia) that were related to Takata airbags.

In April and May 2013, a total of 3.6 million cars were recalled due to defective Takata airbags. All of those airbags were made at, or otherwise used inflator units manufactured by, Takata's Monclova Plant in Coahuila, Mexico, operated by Takata's North American/Mexican subsidiary, TK Holdings Inc. In November 2014, BMW announced they would move any orders from the Mexican plant to a Takata plant in Germany.

In June 2014, Takata admitted their Mexican subsidiary had mishandled the manufacture of explosive propellants and improperly stored chemicals used in airbags. Identifying vehicles with defective airbags was made more difficult by the failure of TK Holdings Inc. to keep proper quality control records. That prompted another round of recalls in June 2014. In a statement the company said, "We take this situation seriously, will strengthen our quality control and make a concerted effort to prevent a recurrence."

On June 23, 2014, auto manufacturers BMW, Chrysler, Ford, Honda, Mazda, Nissan, and Toyota announced they were recalling over three million vehicles worldwide due to Takata-made airbags. The reason was that they could rupture and send debris flying inside the vehicle. This was in response to a US National Highway Traffic Safety Administration (NHTSA) investigation that was initiated after the NHTSA received three injury complaints.

In a statement on June 23, 2014, Takata said they believed excessive moisture was the cause of the defect. Haruo Otani, an official at the vehicle recall section of the Japanese Ministry of Land, Infrastructure, Transport and Tourism, said that moisture and humidity could be seeping inside inflators, destabilizing the volatile propellant inside.

In July 2014, a pregnant Malaysian woman was killed in a collision involving her 2003 Honda City which contained a defective airbag. The woman, aged 42, died when a metal fragment from a ruptured driver's side airbag sliced into her neck in the collision in which she was driving at around 30 km/h (18 mph) when another vehicle hit her at a junction, according to a lawsuit filed by her father at a Miami federal court. Her daughter, delivered after the mother's death, died three days later. On November 18, 2014, the NHTSA ordered Takata to initiate a nationwide airbag recall. The action came as 10 automakers in the U.S. recalled hundreds of thousands of cars equipped with potentially faulty airbags manufactured by Takata.

As of May 19, 2015, Takata is now responsible for the largest auto recall in history. Takata has already recalled 40 million vehicles across 12 vehicle brands for "Airbags that could explode and potentially send shrapnel into the face and body of both the driver and front seat passenger". This recall brought the number up to about 53 million automobiles eligible for this recall. In November 2015, Takata was fined $200 million ($70 million paid upfront) by U.S. federal regulators in response to Takata's admission of fault. Toyota, Mazda and Honda have said that they will not use ammonium nitrate-based inflators.

On May 4, 2016, the NHTSA announced recall campaigns of an additional estimated 35-40 million inflators, adding to the already 28.8 million inflators previously recalled. On January 13, 2017, the United States charged three Takata executives, Shinichi Tanaka, Hideo Nakajima and Tsuneo Chikaraishi for Takata's exploding airbags. The company agreed to plead guilty and to pay $1 billion to resolve the investigation, which consisted of a $25 million fine, $125 million for victim compensation and $850 million to compensate automobile manufacturers. At least 16 deaths are linked to the defective airbags.

On February 28, 2018 the Australian Federal Government announced the compulsory recall of all cars fitted with Takata airbags, with 2.3 million vehicles subject to the compulsory recall and the airbags must be replaced within two years.

On March 1, 2018, it was announced that 106,806 Volkswagen vehicles, including models such as the Golf, Passat, Polo, CC Eos, and Up!, have been recalled for containing defective Takata airbags. On March 2, 2018, Holden announced that the airbag recall now includes 330,000 of their Australian vehicles, despite not originally having any of their cars in the federal government's compulsory recall list.

On April 4, 2018, the New Zealand government, having decided "they present the highest safety risk to drivers and passengers," announced a compulsory recall of 50,000 vehicles fitted with Alpha-type Takata airbags. This compulsory recall is said to be only the second in New Zealand's history and the largest vehicle recall of its kind. The Ministry of Commerce and Consumer Affairs stated that it will also block the importation of any vehicles whose faulty airbags have not been replaced.

On June 28, 2018, Transport Canada announced the recall of 222,336 Honda vehicles manufactured between 2001 and 2007 that previously had their front passenger airbags modified under the original Takata airbag recall of June 23, 2014. The modifications done to the original airbags feature a non-desiccated inflator, which could rupture upon deployment, causing metal inflator fragments to pass through the cushion material, causing injury or death. Honda did not replace the airbag in the original recall. Honda is replacing these airbags with units that feature a desiccated inflator.

On January 4, 2019, Ford issued a recall for an additional 953,000 vehicles, including 782,384 in the United States and federalized territories and 149,652 in Canada. Affected vehicles included 2010 Ford Edge and Lincoln MKX, the 2010 and 2011 Ford Ranger, the 2010 to 2012 Ford Fusion and Lincoln MKZ, the 2010 and 2011 Mercury Milan, and the 2010 to 2014 Ford Mustang. This was a planned expansion of previously recalled vehicles as identified earlier by the NHTSA. On December 4, 2019, Takata recalled another 1.4 million front driver inflators in the U.S., according to government documents.

On December 17, 2019, The Australian Competition and Consumer Commission (ACCC) issued a new warning affecting around 78,000 cars manufactured between 1996 and 2000 of the following makes; Audi, BMW, Ford, Honda, Mazda, Mitsubishi, Suzuki and Toyota.

In June 2021, Joyson announced that they had discovered over a thousand cases where Takata had falsified seat belt safety test data.

In July 2022, Stellantis asked 29,000 owners of 2003 Dodge Ram pickups to stop driving after a person was killed when a Takata airbag inflator exploded. In November Stellantis urged an additional 276,000 car owners to stop driving their vehicles after three other crash deaths were tied to Takata airbag inflators.

In February 2023, Honda issued warnings to the owners of 8,200 Acura and Honda vehicles not to drive following a death caused by a faulty Takata airbag inflator. Honda has reported 17 deaths and more than 200 injuries in the United States related to Takata inflators.

In January 2024, Toyota and General Motors issued a recall of 61,000 of their older Corolla, Matrix, RAV4 and Pontiac Vibe model vehicles sold in the United States that carry the Takata airbag. This recall affected 50,000 Toyota and 11,000 General Motors vehicles.

As of January 2024, over 100 million airbag inflators worldwide have been recalled by more than 20 carmakers. As of September 2024, 28 deaths in the US and 35 deaths globally were attributed to the faulty airbag inflators.

==== Cars affected ====
As of 2017, car manufacturers affected by this recall include Acura, Audi, BMW, Cadillac, Chevrolet, Chrysler, Citroën, Daimler Trucks North America, Daimler Vans USA LLC, Dodge/Ram, Ferrari, Ford, GMC, Honda, Infiniti, Jaguar, Jeep, Land Rover, Lexus, Lincoln, Mazda, McLaren, Mercedes-Benz, Mercury, Mitsubishi, Nissan, Pontiac, Saab, Saturn, Scion, Subaru, and Toyota.

In 2014, BMW, Chrysler, Ford, Honda, Mazda, Nissan, and Toyota notified the NHTSA that they were conducting limited regional recalls to address a possible safety defect involving Takata airbag inflators.

In May 2014, General Motors expanded their earlier recall of their 2012 Chevrolet Cruze sedan and other models because of an electrical problem with the Takata airbags. The recall also included the Buick Verano, the Chevrolet Sonic and the Chevrolet Camaro.

On June 25, 2014, General Motors told their North American dealers to stop selling their 2013 and 2014 model Chevrolet Cruze sedans. GM stated, "Certain vehicles may be equipped with a suspect driver's airbag inflator module that may have been assembled with an incorrect part." The airbags involved were made by Takata Corporation. On June 11, 2014, Toyota recalled 2.3 million vehicles, many for the second time.

On July 17, 2015, Ferrari issued a recall for their lineup from the 2014-15 model years due to the driver's side airbags being improperly installed and the leather covering them improperly glued. This was discovered when the company was conducting tests on a 458 Italia and the airbags would deploy at a rotated orientation, potentially causing injuries.

Ford added certain models to the list after a 10th death occurred when the airbag in a 2006 Ford Ranger pickup driven by a Georgia man ruptured violently in South Carolina, in late December 2015.

Takata claimed that the issue has only been shown to affect vehicles in hot and humid locations. However, all potentially affected vehicles have been recalled as a precaution.

In South America, Brazil was the only country to register a defect in this company's airbags in 17 car brands. According to estimates from Secretaria Nacional de Trânsito (SENATRAN), owners of 2.5 million of the 3.5 million vehicles involved didn't undergo inspection to exchange the product.In total, eight people died in seven crashes involving Honda vehicles (Honda Civic) and one involving General Motors (Chevrolet Celta). The Japanese brand, however, only acknowledged 1. The most recent case occurred in the municipality of São Gonçalo in Rio de Janeiro in April 2024. Also in 2024, multiple Opel models built under GM were recalled due to the same issue.

In 2025 Citroën recalled almost 900,000 cars in Europe. The recall affected the Citroën C3 from the years 2009 up to 2019. It also affected the DS3 from the same years. In June Stellantis upgraded the recall and urged owners to not drive the car until the issue with the airbag is resolved. The recall was expanded further in August to include the 2010-2018 C4, DS4 and DS5.

== See also ==
- List of companies of Japan
- Ammonium nitrate, used by Takata as airbag propellant from the late 1990s as a cheaper, but less stable alternative to tetrazole
- Sodium azide, older, highly stable airbag propellant phased out by Takata in the 1990s in favor of the less potentially toxic tetrazole
- Guanidine nitrate, alternative airbag propellant used in Autoliv and TRW airbags, less sensitive to moisture
