= Gentex (automotive supplier) =

American manufacturer

Gentex Corporation
- Type: Public
- Traded as: Nasdaq: GNTX; S&P 400 Component
- Founded: 1974; 52 years ago
- Founder: Fred Bauer
- Headquarters: Zeeland, Michigan
- Key people: Steve Downing, James Wallace
- Revenue: ▲US$2.53 billion (2025)
- Net income: ▼US$385 million (2025)
- Number of employees: 5,000
- Website: gentex.com

Gentex Corporation is an American electronics and technology company that develops, designs, and manufactures automatic-dimming rear-view mirrors, camera-based driver assistance systems, and other equipment for the automotive industry. They produce dimmable aircraft windows for the commercial, business and general aviation markets. In addition, the company produces photoelectric smoke detectors and signaling devices for the North American fire protection market as well as the HomeLink Wireless Control System.

Founded in 1974, Gentex Corporation is based in Zeeland, Michigan. They created the first dual-sensor photoelectric smoke detector, and pioneered electrochromic automatic-dimming mirrors for the automotive industry and smart windows for the aviation industry. Gentex has more than 1,700 patents on various technologies and products.

In analyses of the industry in 2001, Gentex had the highest market-to-book value of any automotive supplier. As of 2020, about 98 percent of the company's sales are derived from the automotive market. As of 2018, less than 1 percent of the company's business comes from aerospace applications of dimmable windows.

== History ==
Gentex was founded in 1974 by Fred Bauer as a manufacturer of fire protection products. Bauer became CEO of the company in May 1986, and also served as Chairman of the Board of Directors. He retired in 2018, and was succeeded by Steve Downing as CEO and by James Wallace as Chairman of the Board. In April 2025, Gentex acquired Voxx International, growing their portfolio of automotive electronics while expanding into the automotive and consumer audio spaces.

== Fire protection ==
Gentex created the first dual-sensor photoelectric smoke detector, considered to be less prone to false alarms, while still quickly detecting smoldering fires. Gentex smoke detectors are used in hospitals, hotels, offices and other buildings worldwide. In the early 1990s, Gentex introduced a smoke detector equipped with a strobe light which is designed to alert deaf and hard of hearing individuals. Gentex manufactures a wide range of photoelectric detectors for fire alarm systems, standalone, and interconnect systems. In addition, Gentex also offers a wide variety of fire alarm notification appliances for commercial applications such as audible horns, strobe lights, combination horn strobes, speakers, speaker strobes, etcetera.

== Automotive ==
=== Mirrors ===
Gentex first introduced a rear-view mirror that automatically adjusts to potentially dangerous glare conditions in 1982.

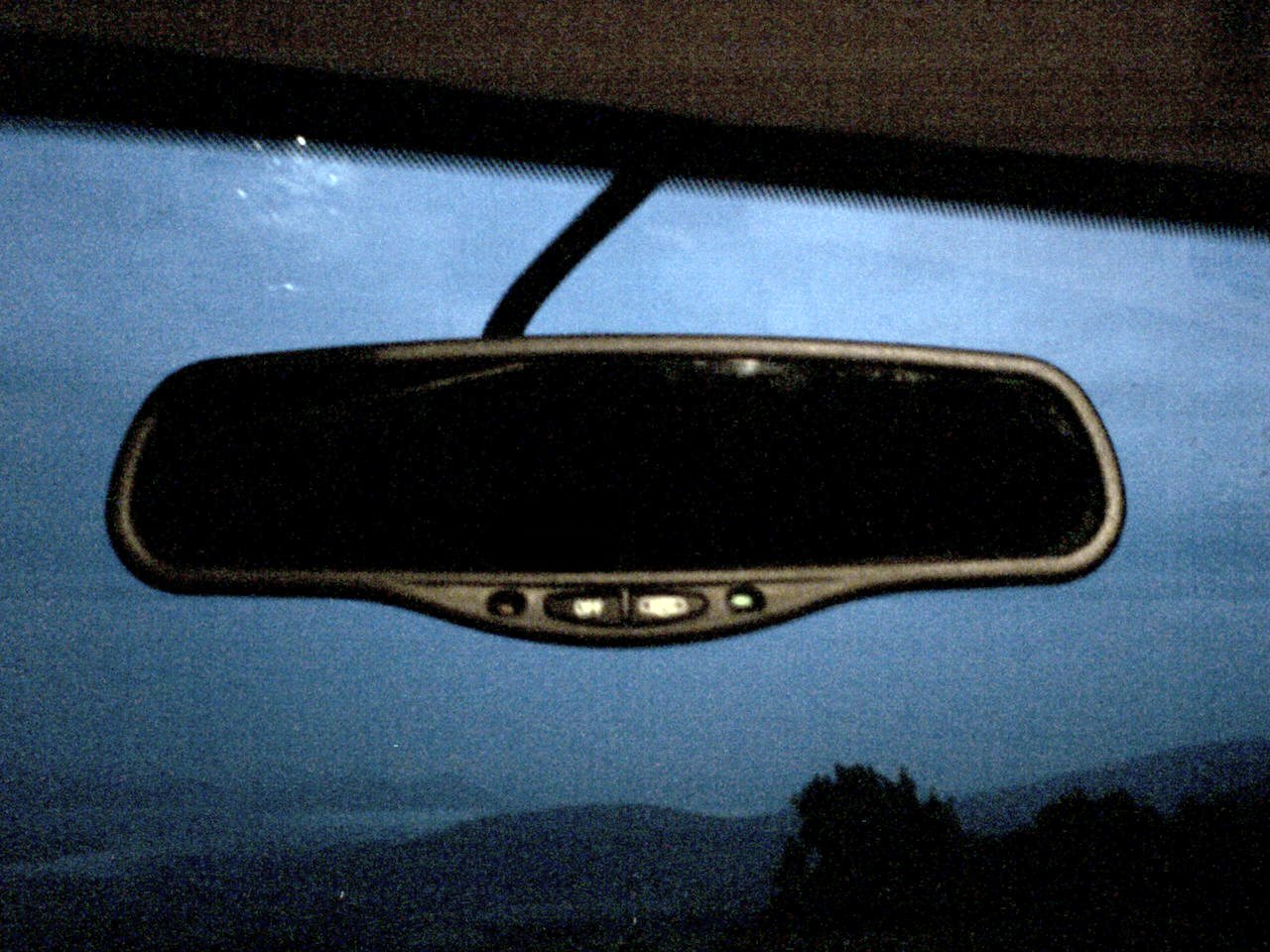
A Gentex auto-dimming car mirror.

Gentex began selling an automatic dimming mirror based on electrochromism in 1987. An electrochromic gel is placed between two pieces of glass, which allows the mirror to dim in proportion to the glare level. The reduction of glare eliminates the temporary blind spot caused by the Troxler effect after the glare source leaves the field of view. These mirrors have forward- and rearward-facing sensors to measure the ambient light level and glare of approaching vehicles, respectively.

In 1991, exterior electrochromic mirrors were added to the Gentex product line. These mirrors operate on the same principle as the interior mirrors. In 1997, the geometry of the mirror's surface was adapted to create spherically curved glass with the goals of eliminating blind spots and offering an expanded field of view.

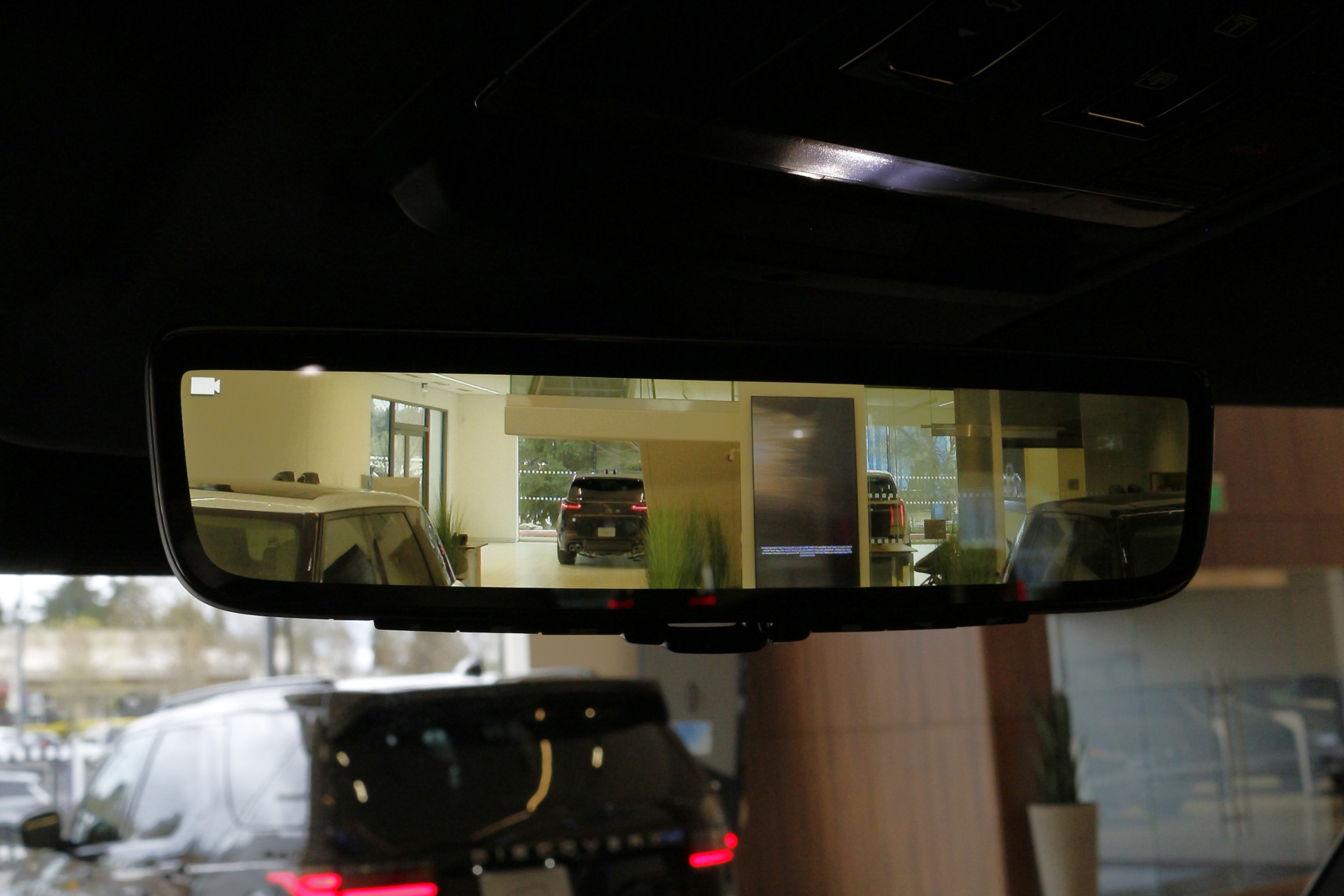
Gentex Full Display Mirror

As of 2016, Gentex introduced the Gentex Full Display Mirror, which provides a video display with a panoramic view of what is behind the vehicle.

=== Air quality and smoke detection ===
As of 2020, Gentex is expanding its smoke detection capabilities, developing sensing units for use in cars and other vehicles, to continuously sample air quality for smoke, vaping, and other airborne contaminants. Sensors in publicly used vehicles could have both sanitation and security applications.

=== Additional features ===
- Compass/Temperature display
- Map light
- OnStar
- HomeLink Wireless Control System
- Tire pressure indicator
- SmartBeam, the company's automatic headlight dimmer
- Automotive grade microphones
- Rear camera display (RCD) - a realtime panoramic view of the rear of the vehicle only when in reverse gear
- Exterior mirror turn signal repeaters
- Complex exterior mirror geometries

== Aerospace ==
Gentex and PPG Aerospace have delivered electrochromic smart windows for the Boeing 787 Dreamliner. These windows use viologens and a redox agent to adjust the amount of light that is allowed through the window, a similar technology to Gentex' auto-dimming rearview mirrors. The aircraft windows are electronically controlled: an electrical signal affects the action of a conductive medium between layers of glass. The windows can be adjusted by the passenger or crew to control the amount of light that enters, with five levels from completely clear to completely darkened. The windows are 60 percent larger than standard aircraft windows.

The aircraft window was included in the exhibition Design Life Now: National Design Triennial, which appeared at the Smithsonian's Cooper-Hewitt National Design Museum in New York City at the Institute of Contemporary Art, Boston in 2007.

Gentex is also developing electronically dimmable windows for aircraft that are capable of automatically responding to changes in sunlight, adapting for example when an aircraft turns. The windows can darken to complete black-out capability in under 30 seconds.

Gentex is AS9100 certified, an industry standard required by the majority of major aircraft manufacturers, and is capable of meeting production standards as an original equipment manufacturer (OEM) for aircraft.
