= Joyson Safety Systems =

American automotive supplier based in Michigan

- Formerly: Breed Corporation; Breed Automotive Corporation; Breed Technologies, Inc.; Key Safety Systems
- Type: Private
- Industry: Automotive safety systems manufacturing
- Predecessor: Key Safety Systems, Takata Corporation
- Founded: 1961; 65 years ago (as Breed Corporation); 1986; 40 years ago (as Breed Automotive Corporation); April 10, 2018; 8 years ago in Auburn Hills, Michigan (as Joyson Safety Systems)
- Headquarters: Auburn Hills, Michigan, United States
- Area served: Worldwide
- Products: Airbag systems; Child-restraint systems; Electronics; Interior trims; Seat belts; Steering wheels
- Revenue: $7.5 billion
- Number of employees: 50,000 (2018)
- Parent: Ningbo Joyson Electronic Corporation and PAG
- Website: joysonsafety.com

Joyson Safety Systems (JSS), founded as Breed Corporation and later called Breed Automotive Corporation (BAC), Breed Technologies, Inc. (BTI), and Key Safety Systems (KSS), is a US-based company which develops and manufactures automotive safety systems. The company is a result of KSS purchasing troubled Japanese airbag company Takata Corporation. It is owned jointly by Chinese company Ningbo Joyson Electronic Corporation and PAG. The company headquarters is in Auburn Hills, Michigan, United States. Globally, the company has 50,000 employees across 32 plants and technical centers worldwide. The current CEO of JSS is Philip Shan.

== History ==
=== Origins as Breed Automotive Corporation ===
JSS was initially founded as Breed Corporation in 1961 by Allen K. Breed as a defense-oriented producer of ammunition components, including mortar fuses. In 1968 Breed Corporation, using their fuse technology developed an electromechanical airbag sensor. The sensor was not widely used until mid-1980s when the United States government had a federal mandate for passive restraint systems. Following Breed Corporation's success in developing the first automotive crash sensor in 1984, the airbag sensor part of the corporation was spun off as its own corporation in 1986 as Breed Automotive Corporation (BAC).

In 1991, the United States Congress decreed that all new cars must be equipped with airbags by 1997. In the same year, BAC changed its name to Breed Technologies, Inc (BTI) and went public on the New York Stock Exchange in November 1992. In 1997, Allen Breed retired as CEO, but continued to serve the company as Chairman Emeritus until his death on December 13, 1999. Breed's wife, Johnnie Breed, would take over as CEO.

Between the years of 1994 and 1998, BTI had spent $1.1 billion (equivalent to $2.39 billion in 2025) to acquire 11 different companies attempting to expand BTI's influence in the automotive component market. Among those were the acquisitions in 1997 of two car-related units from AlliedSignal. AlliedSignal established a major presence in the automotive safety restraint market through its Safety Restraints (SRS) operations. The firm was the only supplier of automotive seatbelts and airbags at the time that had complete vertical operations, from fiber extrusion through finished product. SRS Plant in Knoxville performing all fabric weaving and finishing operations for airbag and seatbelt fabrics while SRS plants in Maryville and Greenville performed the cutting, sewing and final assembly of components. Which were then delivered to customers such as General Motors, Suzuki and Chrysler Corp. among others.

In September 1999, BTI filed for Chapter 11 bankruptcy as a result of the massive debt it took on to acquire those companies, and the fiscal losses it faced in 1998.

=== Renamed to Key Safety Systems ===
In April 2003, BTI was bought by Carlyle Management Group (CMG) for between $300 and $315 million. CMG moved BTI's headquarters from Lakeland, Florida to Sterling Heights, Michigan. In September 2003, CMG announced that BTI would be renamed to Key Safety Systems (KSS). The name change was to show KSS's unification with CMG's other affiliates under the Key Automotive Group brand.

KSS continued to operate under Key Automotive Group until it was acquired by the Chinese-based company, Ningbo Joyson Electronic Corporation (“Joyson Electronics”) in early 2016, for $920 million. The companies’ combined sales worldwide were equal to $3 billion at the time of the purchase.

=== Takata acquisition ===
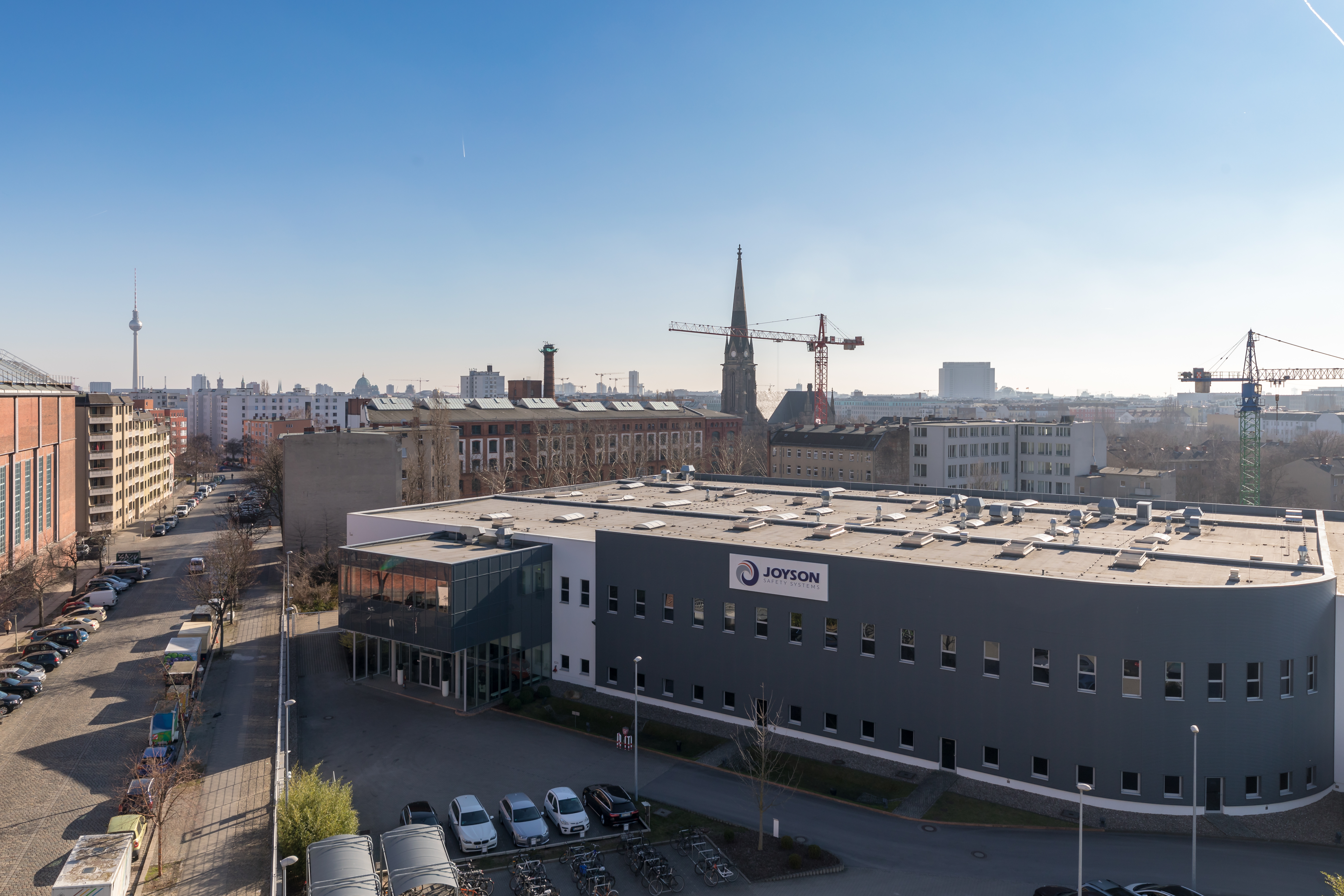
Former Takata location in Berlin, Germany

In June 2017 Takata Corporation, an airbag manufacturer, filed for bankruptcy in the United States and Japan due to lawsuits and large product recalls for unsafe airbags (with faulty airbag inflators) which the company sold to major automotive manufacturers. KSS acquired the remaining Takata assets for about $1.6 billion.

=== Renamed to Joyson Safety Systems ===
Following the antitrust clearance and bankruptcy court approvals in various countries, on April 11, 2018, KSS announced the completion of its acquisition of Takata, and changed its name to Joyson Safety Systems.

== See also ==
- Autoliv
- Automobile safety
- Takata Corporation
- Vehicle safety technology
- ZF Friedrichshafen
