= Automotive News =

Trade newspaper for the automotive industry

- Cover of the May 27, 2024, issue
- Editor-in-chief: Keith Crain
- Categories: Automotive
- Frequency: Weekly
- Publisher: KC Crain
- Total circulation: 57,693 (2011)
- First issue: August 27, 1925; 101 years ago (as Automotive Daily News)
- Company: Crain Communications
- Country: United States
- Based in: Detroit, Michigan, U.S.
- Language: English
- Website: www.autonews.com
- ISSN: 0005-1551 (print); 1557-7686 (web)

Automotive News is a weekly newspaper established in 1925, written for the automotive industry, predominantly for individuals corresponding with automobile manufacturers and automotive suppliers. It is based in Detroit and owned by Crain Communications Inc. Globally, there are more than 55 editors and reporters.

The company's headquarters is located at 1155 Gratiot Avenue in downtown Detroit, Michigan.

== History ==
The first issue of Automotive News was published under the name Automotive Daily News in New York on August 27, 1925, by Slocum Publishing, with George Slocum as its Detroit advertising manager. The chief backer of Automotive Daily News was Bernarr Macfadden.

In 1933, Slocum purchased the other investors' interests, moved the newspaper to Detroit, as well as switching to only publish on Wednesday and Saturday instead of five times a week. In June 1938 the Wednesday issue was discarded, and the June 4 issue was the first to use the name Automotive News. Slocum also reduced the subscription price from $6 to $4 per year. In 1939, he changed the publication day to Monday.

Circulation was 5,000 when Slocum moved the paper to Detroit. It grew to 12,000 at the commencement of World War II but fell to 8,748 during the war. During 1942–45, when there was no auto industry, Automotive News retained 73% of its circulation. From 1936, Pete Wemhoff served as the managing editor, editor, publisher, and general manager for the next 35 years.

Slocum Publishing Co. was purchased by Crain Communications in 1971. Keith Crain became the publisher and editorial director.

Automotive News is now a part of Crain Communications' Automotive News Group. Keith E. Crain is the Editor-in-Chief of Automotive News and Chairman of the Board of Crain Communications. Long-time publisher Jason Stein stepped down in 2021 and was replaced by KC Crain.

== Extensions ==
There are a number of different versions of the publication aimed at specific countries and regions. Automotive News Europe launched in 1996, focusing on the European auto industry. Automotive News China launched in 2006 and is published in both simplified Chinese and English. Automobilwoche is a print publication focusing on the German automotive industry. It is distributed twice a month on Monday and has a circulation of approximately 15,000. Automotive IT was started in 1997, focusing on the auto IT industry and solutions. Automotive News Canada launched in 2015 and focuses on the Canadian automotive industry.

== Annual events ==
The brand hosts several annual events, including:

- Automotive News World Congress
- Automotive News PACE Awards
- Automotive News LA Marketing Seminar
- Automotive News New York Marketing Seminar
- Automotive News: Best Dealerships to Work For
- Automotive News Canada: Best Dealerships to Work For
- Automotive News F&I Week Online Conference
- Automotive News Europe Congress
- Automotive News: Rising Stars
- Automobilwoche Konferenz
- Automotive News Retail Forum: Chicago
- Automotive News Retail Forum: NADA
- Automotive News Fixed Ops Journal Forum
- Automotive News: Leading Women Conference
- Automotive News Canada Congress
- Automotive News: All Stars
- Automotive News Canada: Canadians to Watch
- Automotive News: Care for My Cars

== Online ==
AutoNews.com is a website that provides automotive news updates, including news generated from Automotive News, Automotive News Europe, Automotive News China, Autoweek, Bloomberg, and Reuters business news.
