= Nickel allergy =

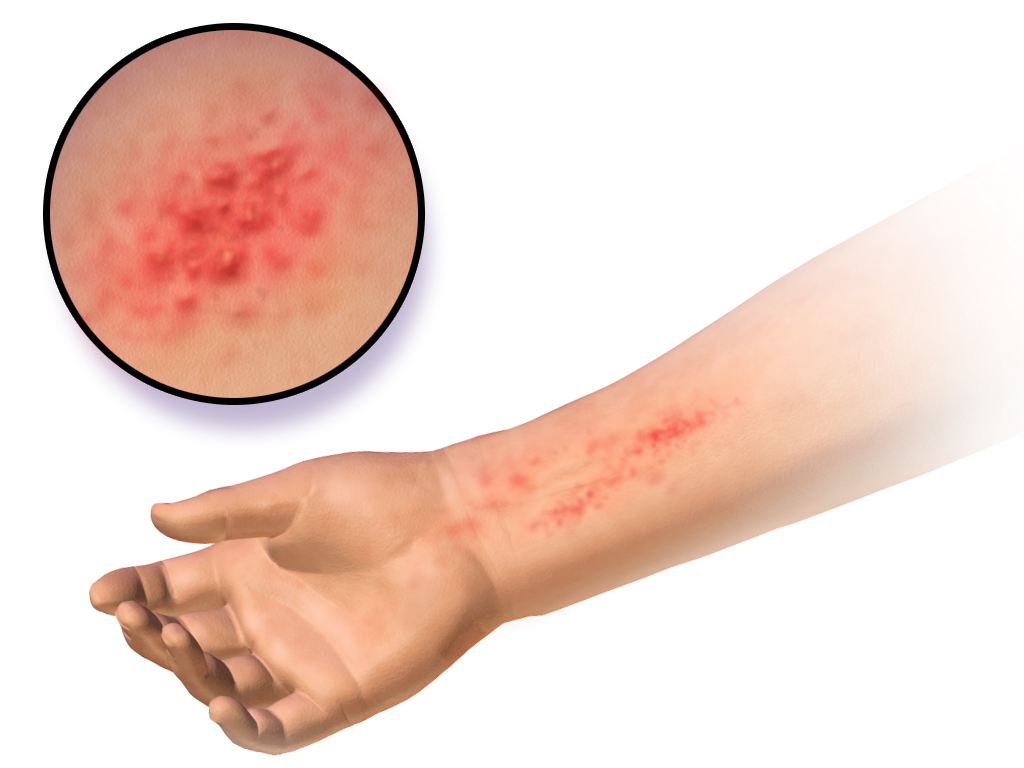
- Specialty: Allergology, immunology

Nickel allergy is any of several allergic conditions provoked by exposure to the chemical element nickel. Nickel allergy often takes the form of nickel allergic contact dermatitis (Ni-ACD), a form of allergic contact dermatitis (ACD). Ni-ACD typically causes a rash that is red and itchy and that may be bumpy or scaly. The main treatment for it is avoiding contact with nickel-releasing metals, such as inexpensive jewelry. Another form of nickel allergy is a systemic form: systemic nickel allergy syndrome (SNAS) can mimic some of the symptoms of irritable bowel syndrome (IBS) and also has a dermatologic component.

== Signs and symptoms ==
The most common sign of nickel allergy is inflammation of the skin at an area that comes into regular contact with nickel. This often takes the form of a reddened patch of skin with raised bumps (papules) or small blisters (vesicles), and edema. People with chronic dermatitis tend to have dry, scaly, and cracked skin at the site of contact. These sites of inflammation (called "primary eruptions") can occur anywhere on the skin that contacts nickel, but are most common on the hands, face, or anywhere that contacts metal objects such as jewelry or metal clothes buttons. Particularly high levels of nickel exposure can cause irritated patches of skin to appear at other sites on the body (called "secondary eruptions"). These typically occur as blistering rashes on the hands, eyelids, and at the inside of flexing joints (inside the elbow, back of the knee, etc.).

Ingestion of nickel may cause a systemic reaction, which can result in generalized inflammation of the skin across the body, small blisters in the hands, irritation inside the flexing joints (flexural eczema), and redness and irritation of both buttocks.

Systemic contact dermatitis (SCD) is defined as a dermatitis occurring in an epi-cutaneously contact-sensitized person when exposed to haptens systemically such as orally, per rectum, intravesically, transcutaneously, intrauterinely, intravenously, or by inhalation.

The pathophysiology of systemic nickel allergy syndrome (SNAS) is not well understood. The clinical course is determined by an immunological interplay between two types of T cells (Th1 and Th2 responses). SCD is often considered a subset of SNAS, but with only skin manifestations. SNAS presents with an array of symptoms ranging from respiratory to generalized skin rash to gastrointestinal symptoms. The gastrointestinal symptoms may mimic those of irritable bowel syndrome. A meta review evaluating SNAS found that 1% of patients sensitized to nickel reacted to the nickel content of a 'normal' diet, and with increasing doses of nickel more individuals reacted. SNAS is a multilayered immunological response demonstrating variance between individuals and doses of nickel exposure.

== Causes ==
=== Nickel exposure ===
Nickel is both naturally abundant – it is the fifth most common element on earth – and widely used in industry and commercial goods. Workplace nickel exposure is common in many industries, and the performance of normal work tasks can result in nickel skin levels sufficient to elicit dermatitis. Within the workplace, individuals may be exposed to significant amounts of nickel, airborne from the combustion of fossil fuels or from contact with tools that are nickel plated. Historically, workplaces where prolonged contact with soluble nickel has been high have shown high risks for allergic contact nickel dermatitis. For example, nickel dermatitis was common in the past among nickel platers. Outbreaks of nickel allergy from consumer goods have been documented throughout the 20th century, with jewelry, stocking suspenders, and metallic buttons on blue jeans each resulting in dermatitis at the point of contact. Nickel can also be present in food and drinking water; ingestion of increased nickel is not associated with systemic allergic disease, but is associated with flare-ups of dermatitis or aggravation of vesicular hand eczema. Similarly, aggravation of dermatitis has been reported in response to nickel-containing surgical implants or dental gear.

The risk of an object eliciting nickel allergy is linked to the amount of nickel released by its surface (and not to its total nickel content). Suspected objects can be screened by wiping the surface with a 1% dimethylglyoxime solution that turns pink if more than 0.5 μg/cm^{2} per week is released by the surface. Various methods exist to test the skin or nails for nickel exposure, typically relying on wiping the skin, then quantifying the nickel on the wipe via mass spectrometry.

Dietary nickel exposure may come from high-nickel foods, possibly canned food (via the packaging), possibly stainless steel cookware (whereas some grades of stainless steel contain more nickel than others), or plumbing (especially the first water run from the tap in the morning).

=== Physiology ===
Nickel allergy results in a skin response after the skin comes in contact with an item that releases a large amount of nickel from its surface. It is commonly associated with nickel-containing belt buckles coming into prolonged contact with the skin. The skin reaction can occur at the site of contact, or sometimes spread beyond to the rest of the body. Free (released) nickel that is able to penetrate the skin is taken up by scavenger (dendritic) cells and then presented to the immune system T-Cells. With each subsequent exposure to nickel these T cells become stimulated and duplicate themselves. With enough exposure to nickel, the amassing clones of T-cells reach "threshold" and the skin develops a rash. The rash can appear as acute, subacute, or chronic eczema-like skin patches, primarily at the site of contact with the nickel (e.g., earlobe from nickel earrings). From the time of exposure, the rash usually appears within 12–120 hours and can last for 3–4 weeks or for the continued duration of nickel contact/exposure.

Three simultaneous conditions must occur to trigger Ni-ACD:

1. Direct skin contact with nickel-releasing item
2. Prolonged skin contact with nickel-releasing item
3. A sufficient amount of nickel is released and absorbed into the skin to cause a reaction

The pathophysiology is divided into induction elicitation phases. Induction is the critical phase (immunological event) when skin contact to nickel results in antigen presentation to the T cells, and T cell duplication (cloning) occurs. The metal cation Ni^{++} is a low molecular weight hapten that easily penetrates the stratum corneum (top layer of skin). Nickel then binds to skin protein carriers creating an antigenic epitope. The determining factor in sensitization is exposure of significant amounts of "free nickel". This is important because different metal alloys release different amounts of free nickel. The antigenic epitope is collected by dermal dendritic cells and Langerhans cells, the antigen-presenting cells (APC) of the skin, and undergo maturation and migration to regional lymph nodes. The complex is predominantly expressed on major histocompatibility complex (MHC) II, which activates and clonally expands naive CD4+ T cells. Upon re-exposure these now primed T cells will be activated and massively recruited to the skin, resulting in the elicitation phase and the clinical presentation of Ni-ACD.

Although ACD has been considered a Th1 predominate process, recent studies highlight a more complex picture. In Ni-ACD other cells are involved including: Th17, Th22, Th1/IFN and the innate immune responses consistent with toll-like receptor 4.

== Prevention ==
Nickel has a wide utility of application in manufactured metals because it is both strong and malleable, leading to ubiquitous presence and the potential for consumers to be in contact with it daily. However, for those who have the rash of allergic contact dermatitis (ACD) due to a nickel allergy, it can be a challenge to avoid. Foods, common kitchen utensils, cell phones, jewelry, and many other items may contain nickel and be a source of irritation due to the allergic reaction caused by the absorption of free released nickel through direct and prolonged contact. The most appropriate measure for nickel-allergic persons is to prevent contact with the allergen.

In 2011, researchers showed that applying a thin layer of glycerine emollient containing nanoparticles of either calcium carbonate or calcium phosphate on an isolated piece of pig skin (in vitro) and on the skin of mice (in vivo) prevents the penetration of nickel ions into the skin. The nanoparticles capture nickel ions by cation exchange, and remain on the surface of the skin, allowing them to be removed by simple washing with water. Approximately 11-fold fewer nanoparticles by mass are required to achieve the same efficacy as the chelating agent ethylenediamine tetraacetic acid. Using nanoparticles with diameters smaller than 500 nm in topical creams may be an effective way to limit the exposure to metal ions that can cause skin irritation'.

Pre-emptive avoidance strategies (PEAS) might ultimately lower the sensitization rates of children who would develop ACD It is theorized that prevention of exposure to nickel early on could reduce the number of those that are sensitive to nickel by one-quarter to one-third. Identification of the many sources of nickel is vital to understanding the nickel sensitization story, food like chocolate and fish, zippers, buttons, cell phones and even orthodontic braces and eyeglass frames might contain nickel. Items that contain sentimental value (heirlooms, wedding rings) could be treated with an enamel or rhodium plating.

The Dermatitis Academy has created an educational website to provide more information about nickel, including information about prevention, exposure, sources, and general information about nickel allergy. These resources provide guidance in a prevention initiative for children worldwide.

Prevention of SNAS includes modifying dietary choices to avoid certain foods that are higher in nickel than others.

== Diagnosis ==
Nickel allergy is typically diagnosed by patch testing – applying a patch with 2.5% (in North America) or 5% (in Europe) nickel sulfate to the upper back and looking for irritation on the skin. As with other causes of allergic contact dermatitis, patches containing several common allergens are typically applied to the back for 48 hours, removed, then the spots examined for allergic reactions 2 to 5 days later.

SNAS can often mimic IBS and may be more common than is widely appreciated. It therefore should be considered as a differential diagnosis item when a doctor is considering a diagnosis of IBS, and nickel allergy testing is advisable as a means to exclude or confirm SNAS. Even before such testing, some differentiating factors in the medical history are if certain foods prompt the symptoms (for example, peanuts or shellfish), whereas IBS is not specific to those foods.

== Treatment ==
Once a nickel allergy is detected, the best treatment is avoidance of nickel-releasing items. The top 13 categories that contain nickel include beauty accessories, eyeglasses, money, cigarettes, clothes, kitchen and household, electronics and office equipment, metal utensils, aliment, jewelry, batteries, orthodontic and dental appliances, and medical equipment. Other than strict avoidance of items that release free nickel, there are other treatment options for reduction of exposure. The first step is to limit friction between skin and metallic items. Susceptible people may try to limit sweating while wearing nickel items, to reduce nickel release and thus decrease chances for developing sensitization or allergy. Another option is to shield electronics, metal devices, and tools with fabric, plastic, or acrylic coverings.

There are dimethylglyoxime test kits that can be very helpful to check for nickel release from items prior to purchasing. The American Contact Dermatitis Society 'find a provider' resource can help identify clinicians with training in providing guidance lists of safe items. In addition to avoidance, healthcare providers may prescribe additional creams or medications to help relieve the skin reaction.

== Epidemiology ==
Nickel allergy is the most common contact allergy in industrialized countries, affecting around 8% to 19% of adults and 8% to 10% of children. Women are affected 4–10 times as frequently as men. Nickel allergy is estimated to affect 4% of men and 16% of women worldwide. In southern European countries, nickel allergy is more common than in northern countries, 16% versus 10%. The results are similar in the USA.

== Regulation ==
As nickel can be harmful to skin, its use in daily products must be regulated. A safety directive has been in place in Europe since 2004. Denmark in 1980, and then shortly after the European Union (EU), enacted legislation that limited the amount of free nickel in consumer products that come in contact with the skin. This resulted in significantly decreased rates of sensitization among Danish children 0 to 18 years of age from 24.8% to 9.2% between 1985 and 1998, with similar reductions in sensitization throughout the EU.

No such directive exists in the United States, but efforts are under way to mandate safe use guidelines for nickel. In August 2015, the American Academy of Dermatology (AAD) adopted a nickel safety position paper. The exact prevalence of Ni-ACD in the general population in the US is largely unknown. However, current estimates gauge that roughly 2.5 million US adults and 250,000 children have a nickel allergy, which costs an estimated $5.7 billion per year for treatment of symptoms. Loma Linda University, Nickel Allergy Alliance, and Dermatitis Academy created the first open access self-reported patient registry to record nickel allergy prevalence data in the US.[ref 23]

== History ==
In the 17th century, copper miners in Saxony, Germany, began to experience irritation caused by a "dark red ore". Since the substance, which would later be called nickel, led to many ailments, they believed it to be protected by "goblins", and called it "Goblin's Copper". Josef Jadassohn described the first case of metal contact dermatitis in 1895, to a mercury-based therapeutic cream, and confirmed the cause by epicutaneous patch testing. In the next century nickel began to be mass-produced for jewelry worldwide due to its cheap cost, resistance to corrosion and high supply. American Metal Market predicted in 2001 that concerns about the health effects of nickel and the use of nickel-free Nordic gold in the Euro would impact the nickel market, estimating 50,000 to 70,000 tonnes of nickel would be scrapped from obsolete coinage in 2002.

A large comprehensive study of healthy US volunteers in 1979 found that 9% had been unknowingly sensitized to nickel. As of 2008, that number has tripled. Most importantly, nickel allergy among children is increasing, with an estimated 250,000 children sensitized to nickel.

Published literature shows an exponential increase in reported nickel allergy cases. The North American Contact Dermatitis Group (NACDG) patch tested 5,085 adults, presenting with eczema-like symptoms, showing 19.5% had a positive reaction to nickel. Nickel allergy is also more prevalent in women (17.1%) than men (3%), possibly due to cultural norms related to jewelry and ear piercings and therefore increased exposure to nickel. In order to investigate the current prevalence of nickel, Loma Linda University, Nickel Allergy Alliance, and Dermatitis Academy, are conducting a self-reporting nickel allergy-dermatitis survey.
