= Scrollerwheel =

Mechanical device

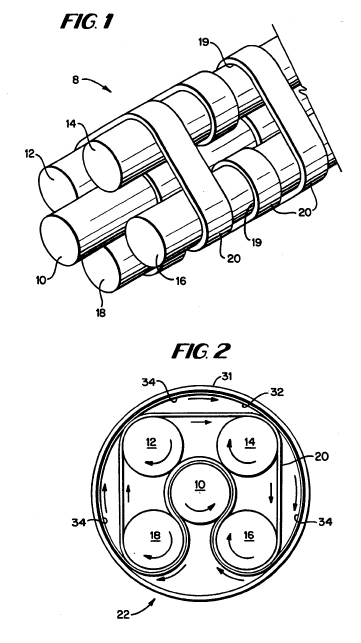
Structure of a scrollerwheel

A scrollerwheel is a mechanical device composed of a number of rollers (four or more) and connective bands under tension, which wrap around and weave between the rollers forming a self-supporting cluster possessing a central roller. The cluster of rollers is bound by the connective bands in such a way that the static friction between the rollers and bands prevent the rollers from slipping as they roll and orbit the central roller. Scrollerwheels are related in operational principle to rolamite linear bearings (developed at Sandia National Labs in the late 1960s), and like them, they display only rolling friction, and not the kinetic friction inherent in most mechanical bearings.

The rollers can have a cross section in a variety of shapes other than circular, such as: ovals (which with a single oval roller as the central roller, or one of the outer rollers, results in a cammed motion), various varieties of superellipses and Reuleaux polygons.

== Advantages ==
Unlike conventional rolling-element bearings, they do not require lubrication. Consequentially, they can be employed in environments hostile to lubricants: underwater, in a vacuum (where grease will boil) and at elevated temperatures.

They can be constructed from a wide variety of materials, have zero backlash, and they are not fouled by gritty particulates.

== Disadvantages ==
Scrollerwheels cannot have an aspect ratio (diameter compared to thickness) as high as conventional mechanical bearings.

== See also ==
- Rolamite
