= Baboon syndrome =

- Specialty: Dermatology

Symmetrical drug-related intertriginous and flexural exanthema (SDRIFE), popularly known as baboon syndrome because of its resemblance to the distinctive red buttocks displayed by female baboons, is a systemic dermatitis characterized by well-demarcated patches of erythema distributed symmetrically on the buttocks. The cause of the syndrome may be drug-related: i.e., induced by systemic administration of hydroxyzine, penicillin, iodinated radio contrast media, and others.

== Symptoms and signs ==
The typical rash commonly appears on buttocks. This then resembles the colour of a baboon's buttocks. Other areas like upper inner thigh and armpits, may be affected by the rash. The rashes are red and well-defined. The presentation is typically symmetrical and not associated with systemic symptoms.

== Treatment ==
Treatment of symmetrical drug related intertriginous and flexural exanthema involves identifying and stopping the causative agent. Topical steroids can help to reduce the redness.

== Epidemiology ==
Baboon syndrome affects both sexes equally, and can occur at any age, but seems to be more common in childhood than in adulthood.

== See also ==
- Airbag dermatitis
- List of cutaneous conditions
