= Airplane airbags =

Airbags that are located in the seat belts on some airplanes

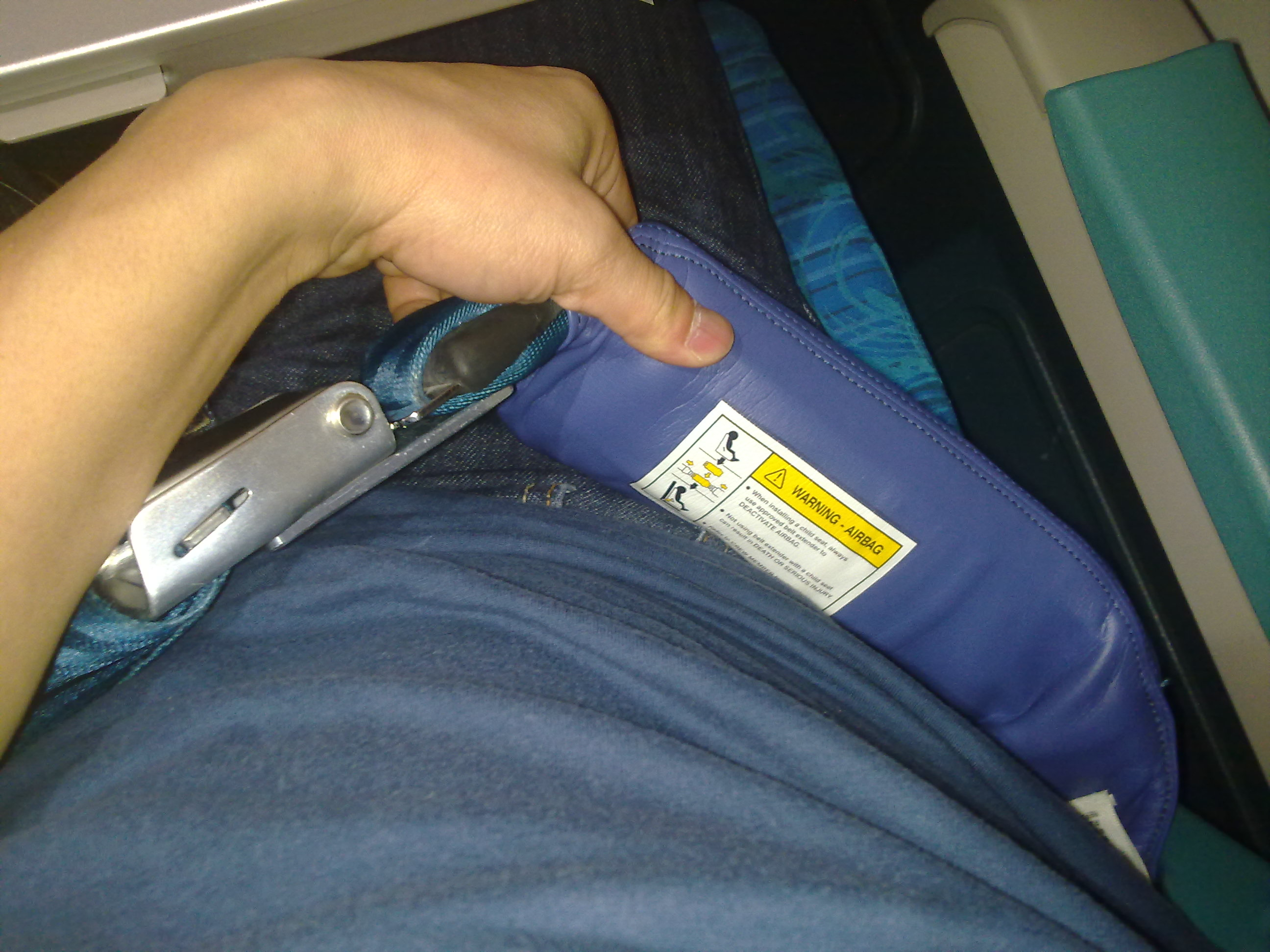
Airplane airbag on a Cathay Pacific Airbus A330

Airplane airbags are airbags that are located in the seat belts on some airplanes. They provide additional head protection for passengers during a crash, to lessen the impact against hard surfaces - such as bulkheads and other seats.

By reducing the risk of injury, airlines are able to install new cabin configurations with increased seating capacity and less clearance around hard surfaces. Airbags are most often installed only on particular seats where the risk of hitting a hard surface is highest.

When a child safety seat is installed in a seat with an airbag, the FAA recommends that a seatbelt extender always be used. The extender deliberately disables the airbag device, to stop it from injuring the child if deployed.

Airbags were first installed on commercial aircraft in 2001, to comply with certification requirements for emergency landings introduced in 1988.

They were first certified for use in general aviation in 2003, with manufacturers providing airbags as standard from 2005. In August 2010, airbags were installed in about 18,000 seats on 7000 airplanes.

== See also ==
- Airbag
