= Rolamite =

Low friction bearing technology

The Rolamite bearing has very little friction

Animation of a Rolamite with different-sized rollers, marked to show their movements

A Rolamite is a technology for very low friction bearings developed by Sandia National Laboratories in the 1960s. It consists of two cylindrical rollers held captive in a channel by an S-shaped metal strip. The strip is under tension, which keeps the rollers pressed together with the strip between them. The rollers move linearly within the channel as they counter-rotate. During the motion each contact surface has the same surface velocity, which results in very low friction. The Rolamite can be used in various ways such as a component in switches, thermostats, valves, pumps, and clutches.

== Development ==
The Rolamite was invented by Sandia engineer Donald F. Wilkes and was patented on June 24, 1969. It was invented while Wilkes was working on a miniature device to detect small changes in the inertia of a small mass. After testing an S-shaped metal foil, which he found to be unstable to support surfaces, the engineer inserted rollers into the S-shaped bends of the band, producing a mechanical assembly that has very low friction in one direction and high stiffness transversely. It became known as Rolamite.

The Rolamite uses a stressed metal band and counter-rotating rollers within an enclosure to create a linear bearing device that loses very little energy to friction. An article in Popular Mechanics claims it is the only basic mechanical invention of the 20th century. Tests by Sandia indicated that Rolamite mechanisms demonstrated friction coefficients as low as 0.0005, an order of magnitude better than ball bearings at the time. There are known Rolamite versions that contain two bands that work in reciprocate parallel for more accurate kinematic transmission at the reverse motion.

A video of a Rolamite in operation, to serve as a warhead safety-switch accelerometer, is available.

== See also ==
- Scrollerwheel
