= Airbag dermatitis =

Skin irritation caused by airbag deployment

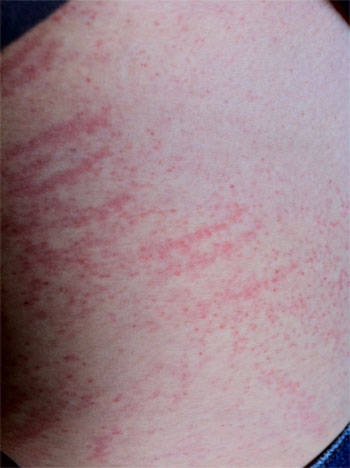
- Dermatitis symptoms on trunk.
- Specialty: Dermatology

Airbag dermatitis (also known as an "airbag burn") is skin irritation secondary to the deployment of airbags. The diagnosis of "air bag dermatitis" is relatively recent; the first case was reported in 1994.

== Signs and symptoms ==
It appears that cutaneous traumatic lesions are highly prevalent: in a retrospective study, the specific injuries observed were 63.6%, 37.8%, and 18.2%, respectively, consisting of abrasions, contusions, and lacerations. The sudden inflation of the airbag, which strikes the chest or traps the hands and forearms between the steering wheel and the airbag itself, can result in traumatic lesions. Traumatic lesions can be superficial abrasions that heal on their own or deep, large lacerations that need to be sutured. Often, "friction burns" occur, especially on the face. The unfolding airbag can cause multiple superficial parallel lesions with its slapping action.

Usually, irritant contact dermatitis affects the face, arms, and upper chest. It is characterized as purpuric aspects and erythema and swelling. Patients report stinging and burning feelings in the afflicted areas. A combination of gases, abrasive powders, and even talc released under pressure can cause irritant dermatitis. Irritant contact dermatitis typically goes away in a few days and appears to be superficial. Common aftereffects include desquamative and post-inflammatory hyperpigmentation.

== See also ==
- Airbag
- Contact dermatitis
- List of cutaneous conditions
