= List of compositions by Erich Wolfgang Korngold =

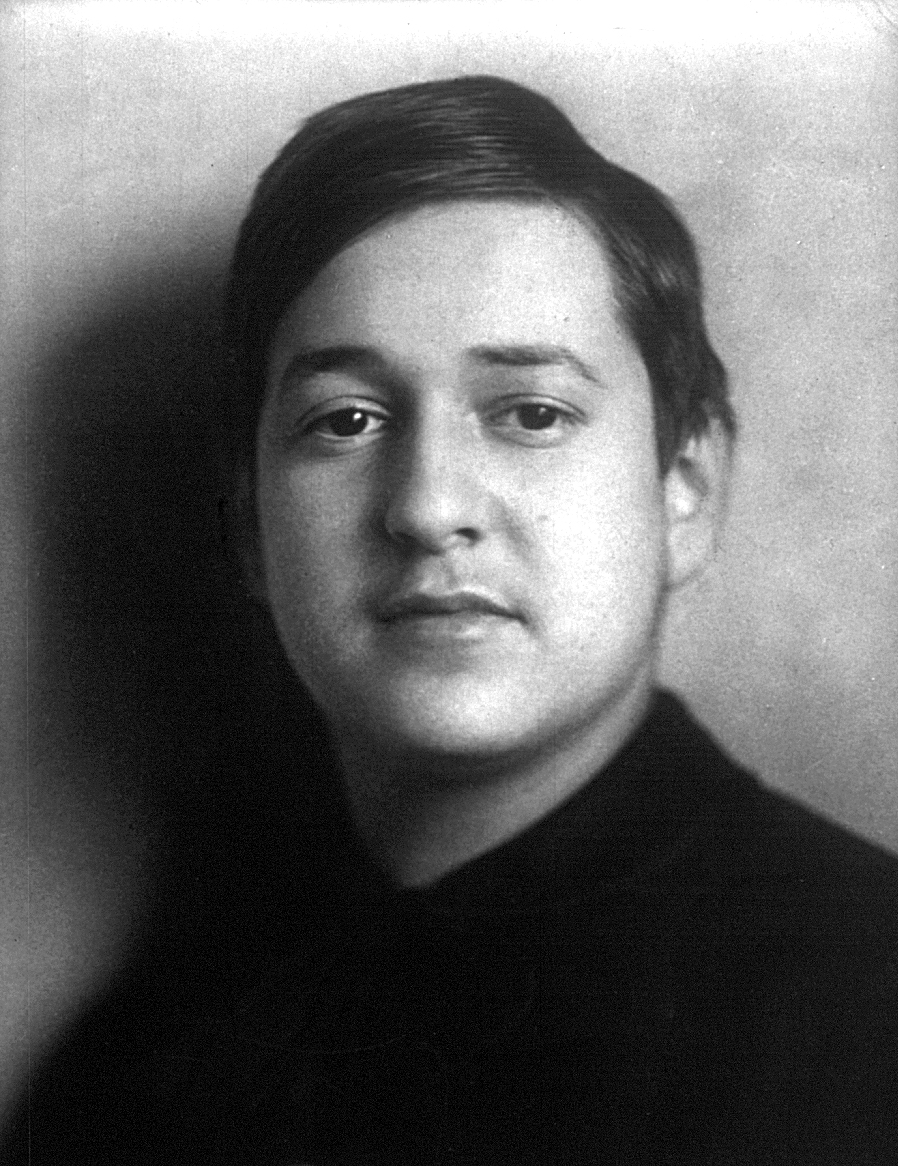
Erich Wolfgang Korngold

This is a list of compositions by Erich Wolfgang Korngold. Source:

== By genre ==
=== Operas and stage works ===
- Der Schneemann (The Snowman) (Composed and first performed 1910)
- Der Ring des Polykrates, Op. 7, opera buffa in one act (1913–1914)
- Violanta, Op. 8, opera in one act (1914–1915), libretto by Hans Müller-Einigen.
- Much Ado About Nothing (1920) incidental music to the Shakespeare production at the Palace of Schönbrunn that premiered May 20, 1920. Korngold later reworked this music into an orchestral suite Op. 11.
- Die tote Stadt, Op. 12, opera in three acts (1920)
- Der Vampir oder Die Gejagten (The Vampire, or the Hunted) (1923), incidental music for a Hans Müller-Einigen drama.
- Das Wunder der Heliane, Op. 20, opera in three acts (1927), libretto by Hans Müller-Einigen.
- Die Kathrin, Op. 28, opera in three acts (1939)
- Die stumme Serenade, Op. 36, operetta (1946–1950)

=== Orchestral works ===
- Märchenbilder ("Fairy Tale Pictures"), Op. 3 (1911) (second movement "The Princess & the Pea" presumed lost)
- Schauspiel-Ouvertüre ("Overture to a Play"), Op. 4 (1911)
- Sinfonietta in B major, Op. 5 (1911–1912)
- Militär-Marsch in B ("Military March in B major") (1917)
- Viel Lärmen um Nichts ("Much Ado about Nothing"), Op. 11, suite for orchestra (1918–1919)
- Sursum Corda, Op. 13 (1919)
- Klavierkonzert in Cis (Piano Concerto in C♯ major for piano left hand), Op. 17 (1923) (composed for Paul Wittgenstein)
- Geschichten von Strauss ("Tales from Strauss"), Op. 21 (1931)
- Baby-Serenade, Op. 24 (1928–1929)
- Violin Concerto in D major, Op. 35 (1937–1939, revised in 1945)
- Cello Concerto in C major, Op. 37 (1946) (expanded from a work written for the 1946 film Deception)
- Symphonic Serenade in B♭ major, Op. 39, for string orchestra (1947–1948)
- Symphony in F♯ major, Op. 40 (1947–1952)
- Theme and Variations, Op. 42 (1953)
- Straussiana (1953)

=== Vocal-orchestral ===
- Der Sturm (The Tempest) for chorus and orchestra, after Heinrich Heine (1913)
- Passover Psalm, Op. 30, hymn for solo voice, chorus and orchestra (1941)
- Prayer, Op. 32, for tenor, women's choir and organ (1941)
- Tomorrow, Op. 33, tone poem for mezzo-soprano, women's choir and orchestra, from the movie The Constant Nymph (1944)

=== Chamber music ===
- Piano Trio in D major, Op. 1 (1909–1910)
- Violin Sonata in G major, Op. 6 (1912–1913)
- String Sextet in D major, Op. 10 (1914–1916)
- Piano Quintet in E major, Op. 15 (1921–1922)
- Viel Lärmen um Nichts ("Much Ado about Nothing"), Op. 11, four movement suite for violin and piano (1918–1919)
- String Quartet No. 1 in A major, Op. 16 (1920–1923)
- Suite for two violins, cello and piano left hand, Op. 23 (1930)
- String Quartet No. 2 in E♭ major, Op. 26 (1933)
- String Quartet No. 3 in D major, Op. 34 (1944–1945), dedicated to Bruno Walter, premiered by Roth Quartet in Los Angeles in 1946.
- Romance-Impromptu, for cello and piano (1946)

=== Piano music ===
- Piano Sonata No. 1 in D minor (1908–1909)
- Don Quixote, six pieces for piano (1909)
- Was der Wald erzählt ("What the Forest Tells"), suite for piano (1909)
- Märchenbilder ("Fairy Tale Pictures"), Op. 3 for piano solo (also orchestrated) (1910)
- Piano Sonata No. 2 in E major, Op. 2 (1910), dedicated to his teacher Zemlinsky, premiered by Schnabel in 1911.
- Vier Kleine Fröhliche Walzer ("Four Little Cheerful Waltzes") (1912)
- Vier kleine Karikaturen für Kinder ("Four Little Caricatures for Children"), Op. 19 (1926)
- Geschichten von Strauss ("Tales from Strauss"), Op. 21 (also orchestrated) (1927)
- Piano Sonata No. 3 in C major, Op. 25 (1931)

=== Songs ===
- Vespers (1911)
- Eichendorff Lieder (1911)
- (Sechs) Einfache Lieder ("Six Simple Songs"), Op. 9 (1911)
- Nachts ("At night") (1913)
- Gansleber (1919)
- (Vier) Lieder des Abschieds ("Four Songs of Farewell"), Op. 14 (1920–1921)
- Drei Gesänge ("Three Songs"), Op. 18 (1924)
- Drei Lieder ("Three Songs"), Op. 22 (1928–1929)
- Unvergänglichkeit ("Immortality"), Op. 27 (1933)
- Narrenlieder ("Songs of the Clown"), Op. 29 (1937)
- Vier Shakespeare-Lieder ("Four Shakespeare Songs"), Op. 31 (1937–1941)
- Fünf Lieder ("Five Songs"), Op. 38 (1948)
- Sonett für Wien ("Sonnet for Vienna"), Op. 41 (1953)

=== Film scores ===
- Waltzes from Vienna (1934)
- A Midsummer Night's Dream (1935) (a re-orchestration of music composed by Felix Mendelssohn)
- Captain Blood (1935)
- Hearts Divided (1936)
- The Green Pastures (1936)
- Anthony Adverse (1936) – Academy Award winner for Best Original Score (awarded to the head of the studio's music department)
- The Prince and the Pauper (1937)
- Another Dawn (1937)
- The Adventures of Robin Hood (1938) – Academy Award winner for Best Original Score
- Juarez (1939)
- The Private Lives of Elizabeth and Essex (1939) – Academy Award nomination for Best Original Score
- The Sea Hawk (1940) – Academy Award nomination for Best Score
- The Sea Wolf (1941)
- Kings Row (1942)
- The Constant Nymph (1943)
- Between Two Worlds (1944)
- San Antonio (1945) (uncredited)
- Devotion (1946)
- Of Human Bondage (1946)
- Deception (1946)
- Escape Me Never (1947)
- Magic Fire (1956) (after Richard Wagner)

=== Arrangements for operettas ===
- Eine Nacht in Venedig (A Night in Venice), Johann Strauss II (1923)
- Cagliostro in Wien (Cagliostro in Vienna), Johann Strauss II (1927)
- Rosen aus Florida (Roses from Florida), Leo Fall (1929)
- Die Fledermaus (The Bat), Johann Strauss II (1929)
- Walzer aus Wien (Waltzes from Vienna), Family Strauss (1930)
- Die schöne Helena (The Beautiful Helena), Jacques Offenbach (1931)
- Das Lied der Liebe (The Song of Love), Johann Strauss II (1931)
- Die geschiedene Frau (The divorced Woman), Leo Fall (1933)
- Rosalinda (= Die Fledermaus), Johann Strauss II (1942)
- Helen Goes to Troy (=La belle Hélène) Jacques Offenbach (1944)
- The Great Waltz (= Walzer aus Wien), Johann Strauss II (1949)

== By opus number ==
- Op. 1 – Piano Trio in D major (1909–1910)
- Op. 2 – Piano Sonata No. 2 in E major (1910)
- Op. 3 – Märchenbilder ("Fairy Tale Pictures"), for piano solo (also orchestrated) (1910)
- Op. 4 – Schauspiel-Ouvertüre ("Overture to a Play") (1911)
- Op. 5 – Sinfonietta in B major (1911–1912)
- Op. 6 – Violin Sonata in G major (1912–1913)
- Op. 7 – Der Ring des Polykrates, opera buffa in one act (1913–1914)
- Op. 8 – Violanta, opera in one act (1914–1915)
- Op. 9 – (Sechs) Einfache Lieder ("Six Simple Songs") (1911)
- Op. 10 – String Sextet in D major (1914–1916)
- Op. 11 – Viel Lärmen um Nichts ("Much Ado for Nothing"), four movement suite for violin and piano (1918–1919)
- Op. 12 – Die tote Stadt, Op. 12, opera in three acts (1920)
- Op. 13 – Sursum Corda (1919)
- Op. 14 – (Vier) Lieder des Abschieds ("Four Songs of Farewell") (1920–1921)
- Op. 15 – Piano Quintet in E major (1921–1922)
- Op. 16 – String Quartet No. 1 in A major (1920–1923)
- Op. 17 – Piano Concerto in C♯ major for piano left hand (1923) (composed for Paul Wittgenstein)
- Op. 18 – Drei Gesänge ("Three Songs"), Op. 18 (1924)
- Op. 19 – Vier kleine Karikaturen für Kinder ("Four Little Caricatures for Children") (1926)
- Op. 20 – Das Wunder der Heliane, opera in three acts (1927)
- Op. 21 – Geschichten von Strauss ("Tales from Strauss") (also orchestrated) (1927)
- Op. 22 – Drei Lieder ("Three Songs") (1928–1929)
- Op. 23 – Suite for two violins, cello and piano left hand (1930)
- Op. 24 – Baby-Serenade (1928–1929)
- Op. 25 – Piano Sonata No. 3 in C major (1931)
- Op. 26 – String Quartet No. 2 in E♭ major (1933)
- Op. 27 – Unvergänglichkeit ("Immortality") (1933)
- Op. 28 – Die Kathrin, opera in three acts (1939)
- Op. 29 – Narrenlieder ("Songs of the Clown") (1937)
- Op. 30 – Passover Psalm, hymn for solo voice, chorus and orchestra (1941)
- Op. 31 – Vier Shakespeare-Lieder ("Four Shakespeare Songs") (1937–1941)
- Op. 32 – Prayer, for tenor, women's choir and organ (1941)
- Op. 33 – Tomorrow, tone poem for mezzo-soprano, women's choir and orchestra, from the movie The Constant Nymph (1944)
- Op. 34 – String Quartet No. 3 in D major (1944–1945)
- Op. 35 – Violin Concerto in D major (1937–1939, revised in 1945)
- Op. 36 – Die stumme Serenade, operetta (1946–1950)
- Op. 37 – Cello Concerto in C major (1946)
- Op. 38 – Fünf Lieder ("Five Songs") (1948)
- Op. 39 – Symphonic Serenade in B♭ major, for string orchestra (1947–1948)
- Op. 40 – Symphony in F♯ major (1947–1952)
- Op. 41 – Sonett für Wien ("Sonnet for Vienna") (1953)
- Op. 42 – Theme and Variations (1953)
