= The Black Cauldron (soundtrack) =

Soundtrack album by Elmer Bernstein
- Released: May 26, 1985 (first release); April 3, 2012 (second release)
- Recorded: 1984−1985
- Studios: Eastwood Scoring Stage, Warner Bros., Los Angeles
- Genre: Orchestral
- Length: 31:36 (first release); 75:35 (second release)
- Labels: Varèse Sarabande (1985 release): Walt Disney; Intrada; (2012 release)
- Producers: George Korngold; Randy Thornton

2012 Re-release cover

The Black Cauldron: Original Motion Picture Soundtrack is the soundtrack album to the animated dark fantasy adventure film The Black Cauldron. The film, unlike other ventures, does not feature any songs, which was a rarity in Disney films. The film, however, featured musical score composed by Elmer Bernstein. Due to the last-minute revisions, much of Bernstein's score were cut and unused. In its minority, the score was re-recorded for the album's first release by Varèse Sarabande in 1985, with Bernstein conducting the Utah Symphony Orchestra. The album soon fell out of print and many of the film's score did not resurface until a bootleg copy entitled "Taran" was supplied to soundtrack specialty outlets in 1986. The full score was re-issued by Intrada Records on April 3, 2012 which consisted of 75-minutes long.

== Critical response ==
Professional ratings
Review scores
Source	Rating
Allmusic	4/5 stars
Filmtracks	4/5 stars

The score received positive reviews from music critics, and today is regarded as obscure but one of the best works by Bernstein and for a Disney animated film. Critics however criticised the inconsistent editing and mixing production of the score, which they felt it as "somewhat lost". Jason Ankeny from AllMusic gave to the soundtrack a positive review, stating that "The Black Cauldron contains no vocal performances or comedic elements, instead embracing the conventions of traditional symphonic music in an attempt to lend new depth and gravitas to family-friendly filmmaking. Bernstein's bleak arrangements and ominous melodies vividly underline the fantasy world portrayed onscreen, and taken purely on its own terms, the score is an undeniable success."

The website Filmtracks wrote: "The score for The Black Cauldron was for Bernstein what Mulan was for Jerry Goldsmith in the next decade: a fascinating journey into a fresh realm that required its music to play a more significant role in the film". It further opined that, "Somewhere in the process of creating the ambitious musical environment for The Black Cauldron, Bernstein lost the narrative romanticism that exists as part of the animated formula, despite his impressive attention to subtle motific manipulation throughout. Perhaps the lack of this formula approach is a refreshing take on an otherwise tired idea at the time, but it may also have contributed to the demise of the picture. The score remains something of an anomaly for the composer during this era, but it's a source of fascination nonetheless." James Southall of Movie Wave wrote " At times the composer is able to stick to genuinely dark areas, focusing on the lower registers of all the sections of the orchestra and providing bold accompaniment which recalls the finer moments of those other fantasy scores."

== Track listing ==
=== Original edition ===
No.	Title	Length
1.	"Escape From The Castle"	2:29
2.	"Taran"	4:00
3.	"The Witches"	2:16
4.	"Gurgi"	3:25
5.	"The Horned King"	2:54
6.	"The Fair Folk"	3:09
7.	"Hen Wen's Vision"	3:43
8.	"Eilonwy"	5:05
9.	"Finale"	4:35
Total length:		31:36

=== 2012 release (re-mastered) ===
No.	Title	Length
1.	"Prologue"	1:08
2.	"Dalben and the Warrior"	3:56
3.	"A Special Pig and a Vision"	2:46
4.	"Journey"	3:32
5.	"Gurgi"	4:31
6.	"Decision"	2:23
7.	"Belly Good"	1:08
8.	"The Horned King"	1:23
9.	"A Second Vision"	2:21
10.	"First Chase"	1:36
11.	"Eilonwy"	1:57
12.	"Rats and Tombs"	2:21
13.	"Escape"	1:45
14.	"Second Chase"	4:02
15.	"In the Forest"	1:27
16.	"Apology"	3:16
17.	"Whirlpool"	2:13
18.	"Fairfolk"	3:08
19.	"Incantation"	1:51
20.	"Morva"	4:12
21.	"The Deal"	0:57
22.	"Surrender"	0:54
23.	"Disappointment"	1:51
24.	"Confidence"	2:05
25.	"Cauldron Born"	3:32
26.	"Sacrifice"	2:24
27.	"Destruction"	2:33
28.	"He's Gone"	2:01
29.	"Bubble Up"	0:43
30.	"Xchange"	1:32
31.	"Gurgi Lives"	2:07
32.	"End Titles"	4:00
Total length:		75:35

== Release history ==
Region	Date	Format	Label
United States	1985	Cassette; CD; LP	Varèse Sarabande
United States	April 3, 2012	CD; digital download	Walt Disney Records; Intrada Records

== Personnel ==
Credits adapted from CD liner notes.

- Elmer Bernstein – composer, conductor
- Fred Mitchell, Gene Shiveley – editor
- Bruce Leek – recording engineer
- Robert Townson – executive producer
- Patricia Sullivan – mastering
- Cynthia Millar – Ondes Martenot
- Utah Symphony Orchestra – performer
- George Korngold – album producer
