= Symphony in F-sharp major (Korngold) =

Symphony composed by Erich Wolfgang Korngold

The Symphony in F♯, Op. 40, is the only symphony by 20th-century Austrian composer Erich Wolfgang Korngold, although as a teenager in 1912 he had written a Sinfonietta, his Op. 5. The symphony was completed in 1952 and dedicated to the memory of American president Franklin D. Roosevelt, who had died seven years earlier. The work reuses various themes from the composer's film scores, including the 1939 film The Private Lives of Elizabeth and Essex.

== Performance and reception ==
The work's premiere on Austrian radio on October 17, 1954, by the Vienna Symphony Orchestra under Harold Byrns was described as "poorly rehearsed and performed." In 1959 Dimitri Mitropoulos wrote: "All my life I have searched for the perfect modern work. In this symphony I have found it. I shall perform it the next season." Then Mitropoulos's death intervened, and in fact the symphony did not enjoy its first concert outing until November 27, 1972, in Munich under Rudolf Kempe. It was, however, aired several times on European radio.

More recently the work has entered the repertoire with a number of CD recordings, and the score has been published by Schott Musik in their Eulenburg Series.

== Structure ==
The symphony lasts about 50 minutes and is in four movements:

1. Moderato, ma energico — intense and stormy, with a jagged main theme
2. Scherzo: Allegro molto
3. Adagio: Lento — long, profound and meditative, in the tradition of Anton Bruckner. A memorial to Roosevelt.
4. Finale: Allegro — optimistic; listeners will recognize references to film music and the song, "Over There".

== Instrumentation ==
The work calls for a large orchestra: 3 flutes (3rd doubling piccolo), 2 oboes, 2 clarinets, bass clarinet, 2 bassoons, double bassoon, 4 horns, 3 trumpets, 4 trombones, tuba, timpani, percussion (3 players are handling: bass drum, cymbals, gong, glockenspiel, marimba, xylophone), harp, piano (doubling celesta) and strings.

== Recordings ==
- John Mauceri – Orchestra della Svizzera Italiana – Supertrain Records
- Werner Andreas Albert – Nordwestdeutsche Philharmonie – cpo
- Marc Albrecht – Orchestre philharmonique de Strasbourg – Pentatone
- Sir Edward Downes – BBC Philharmonic – Chandos
- Rudolf Kempe – Munich Philharmonic – RCA
- André Previn – London Symphony Orchestra – DGG
- James DePreist – Oregon Symphony – Delos
- John Storgårds – Helsinki Philharmonic Orchestra – Ondine
- Timothy Vernon – McGill Symphony Orchestra – McGill
- Franz Welser-Möst – Philadelphia Orchestra – EMI
- John Wilson – Sinfonia of London – Chandos
