= Bitte schön! =

1872 polka composed by Johann Strauss II

Bitte schön! (If you please!), opus 372, is a polka composed by Johann Strauss II. The first two themes of the composition incorporate Strauss' operetta Cagliostro in Wien. The composition was first performed in the summer of 1872.
