= Bertita Harding =

American writer (1902–1971)

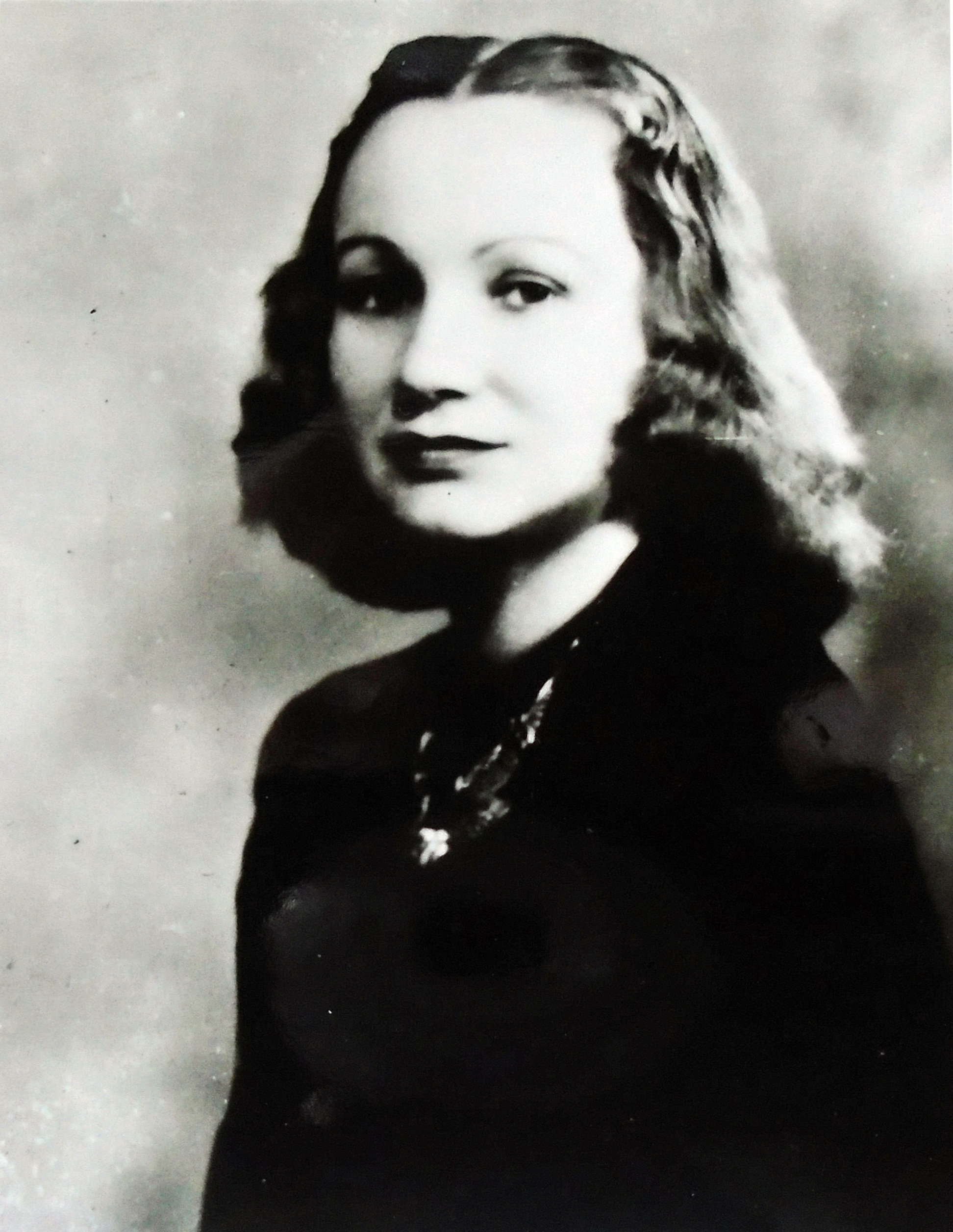
- Born: Bertita Loenarz; 1 November 1902; Nuremberg, Bavaria
- Died: 31 December 1971 (aged 69); Mexico City
- Occupation: Writer
- Writing career
- Notable works: Phantom Crown: The Story of Maximilian and Carlota of Mexico

Bertita Harding (1 November 1902 – 31 December 1971) was a royal German biographer with an easy and sometimes humorous style that made her a popular author.

Her book Phantom Crown, a biography of the life of Emperor Maximilian of Mexico and his wife Charlotte was turned into a screenplay by John Huston for the film Juarez (1939). Magic Fire, her biography of Richard Wagner, was made into a film by William Dieterle in 1955.

== Life ==
She was born as Bertita Carla Camille Loenarz on 1 November 1902 in Nuremberg, Bavaria. Her father, Emil Leonarz, was an engineer from the Rhineland. While working on a public street lighting project in Budapest in 1896, he married the Hungarian Countess Sarolta Pősze-Károly. The couple had five children, two of which died in 1903 iu during a diphtheria outbreak.

In 1904 the family moved briefly to Berlin and the following year to Mexico City where her father worked as general director of the Mexican steel industry. It was in Mexico City where Bertita was raised and spent her formative years. Her childhood was one of privilege. She attended a Catholic school, made trips to Europe and the United States, and learned German, Spanish, English, Hungarian and French. In 1912 the family moved to Monterrey. It was at this time that she began piano lessons. Her parents destined her to follow a career as a concert pianist.

In 1923, she was sent to the United States to improve her English at Wisconsin University. While there, she met Jack Harding, a British-born American, who worked as advertising agent. The couple married on 7 October 1926 and settled in Indianapolis, Indiana. Bertita became a naturalized American citizen in 1927 and began to have some success as concert pianist.

At the age of 28, she abandoned her career as a pianist and started to write Phantom Crown: The Story of Maximilian and Carlota of Mexico. The book sold well. In the following years she continued to publish more books about royalty and she became a well-known author. Indianapolis firm Bobbs-Merrill published most of her books.

Her first book, Phantom Crown, was turned into a screenplay by John Huston for the film Juarez (1939). Invited by Warner Brothers, the studio that made Juarez, she moved with her husband to Hollywood in 1940 as she was offered a job as a writer for the studio. She spent winters in Indianapolis and the summers in Mexico.

In 1940 she made a trip to Brazil that inspired her books on the House of Braganza of Brazil. The following year she began a career as a lecturer, giving more than 120 lectures throughout the United States. During World War II, her husband served as a lieutenant colonel and she sold war bonds in support of the troops. In the latter part of the 1940s Bertita published The Land Columbus loved, a traveling book written with her husband, and wrote Mosaic, in the Fountain, an autobiographical book covering her childhood. The couple had an active social life and traveled extensively as Bertita continued her series of lectures around the United States.

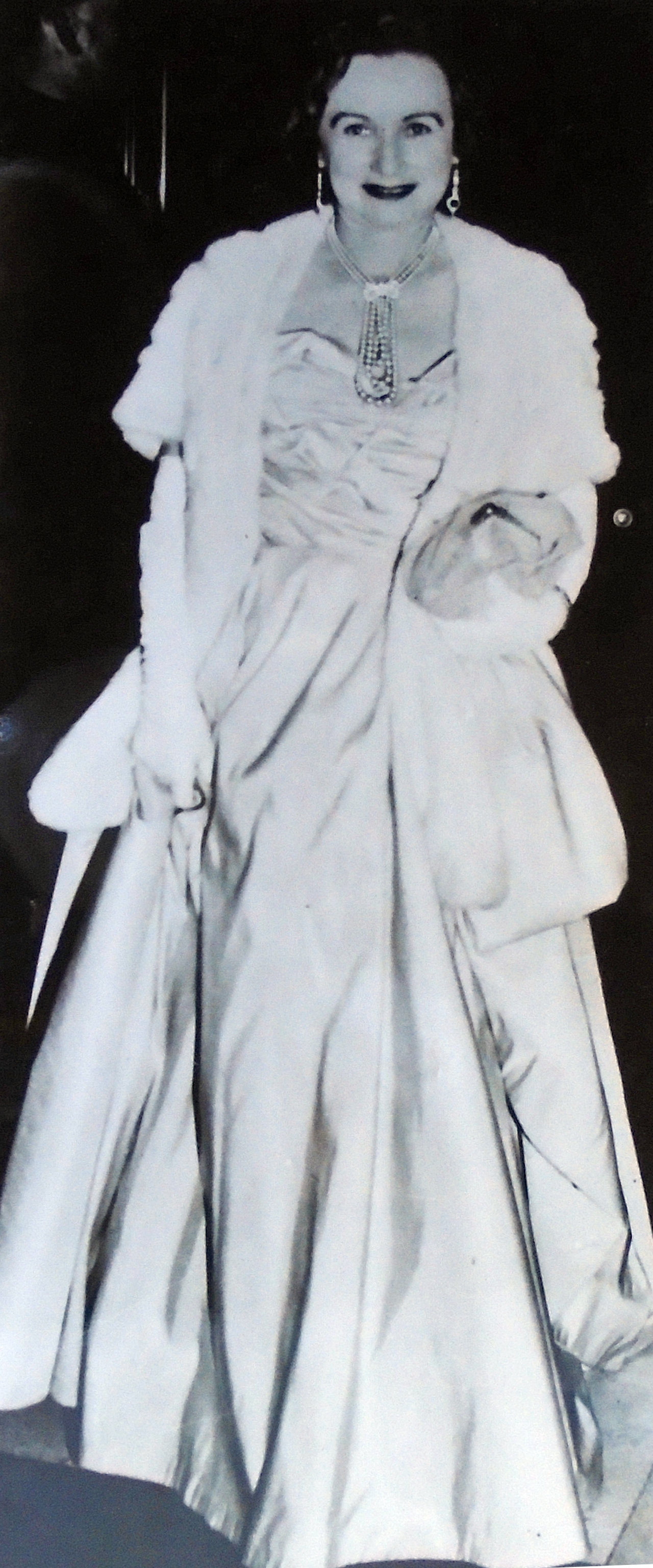
Bertita Harding in a public presentation, 1955

After the death of her husband in 1953, she sold her house in Indianapolis moving permanently to Mexico City. Her biography of Richard Wagner, was made into a German film, Magic Fire, by William Dieterle in 1955. She attended the premier of the film in London.

In 1957 she married Count Josef Radetzky. The couple adopted a four-year-old Mexican orphan named Katya, but the marriage lasted less than one year.

In 1961 she published her last book Concerto: a biography of Clara Schumann. Bertita retired to her Spanish Villa at Lomas of Chapultepec, spending her time painting. She did not finish a biography of Haile Selassie Emperor of Ethiopia. She fought breast cancer that metastasized to the bones.

In May 1971 she married Halstead P. Councilman, an American businessman who had been her friend for years. She died the same year on 31 December 1971.

== Books ==
- Phantom Crown: The Story of Maximilian and Carlota of Mexico, Bobbs-Merrill, 1934, reprinted, Harrap, 1935, Blue Ribbon Books, 1939, 2nd edition, 1960.
- Royal Purple: The Story of Alexander and Draga of Serbia, Bobbs-Merrill, 1935.
- Golden Fleece: The Story of Franz Joseph and Elizabeth of Austria, Bobbs-Merrill, 1937, reprinted, Blue Ribbon Books, 1940.
- Farewell Toinette: The Story of Marie Antoinette, Bobbs-Merrill, 1938.
- Imperial Twilight: The Story of Karl and Zita of Hungary, Bobbs-Merrill, 1939.
- Hungarian Rapsody: The Portrait of an Actress (Camille Feher de Vernet), Bobbs-Merrill, 1940, reprinted, G. G. Harrap, 1941.
- Amazon Throne: The Story of the Branganzas of Brazil, Bobbs-Merrill, 1941, Swedish translation as: Kronta emigranter, Meden, 1942, Spanish translation as: Imperio Amazonica: historia de los Braganzas del Brasil, Ediciones Ercilla, 1943, Portuguese translation as: O Trono do Amzonos: a historia dos Bragancas do Brasil, 1944.
- Lost Waltz: A Story of Exile (the Habsburgs), Bobbs-Merrill, 1944, Portuguese translation as: O Tosao de ouro: a historia dos Habsburgos, J. Olympio.
- Age Cannot Wither: The Story of Duse and D'Annunzio, Lippincott, 1947.
- Southern Empire: Brazil, Coward, 1948.
- The Land Columbus Loved: The Dominican Republic, Coward, 1949, reprinted, Gordon Press, 1978.
- Mosaic in the Fountain (autobiography), Lippincott, 1949.
- Magic Fire: Scenes around Richard Wagner, Bobbs, 1953; Harrap, 1954 with the subtitle "The Story of Wagner's Life and Music" and a dust-wrapper by George Adamson.
- Concerto: The Glowing Story of Clara Schumann, Bobbs, 1961.
- (With Julia Frances Smith) Juliette Low (Daisy): Opera in 3 Acts, (score), 1972, reprinted as: Daisy: An Opera in Two Acts, Mowbray Music Publishers, 1977.

== Bibliography ==
- Rodríguez Romero, Domingo. Bertita Harding. Cronologia.
- Contemporary Authors Online. Bertita Harding. Detroit: Gale, 2005. Literature Resource Center. Web. 16 Aug. 2013.
