= Magic Fire =

1955 film

- Film poster
- Directed by: William Dieterle
- Screenplay by: Bertita Harding; Ewald André Dupont; David T. Chantler
- Based on: novel by Bertita Harding
- Produced by: William Dieterle executive Herbert Yates
- Starring: Alan Badel; Yvonne De Carlo; Rita Gam; Valentina Cortese
- Cinematography: Ernest Haller
- Music by: Erich Wolfgang Korngold
- Distributed by: Republic Pictures
- Release dates: 15 July 1955 (UK); 29 March 1956 (US)
- Running time: 120 minutes
- Country: United States
- Language: English

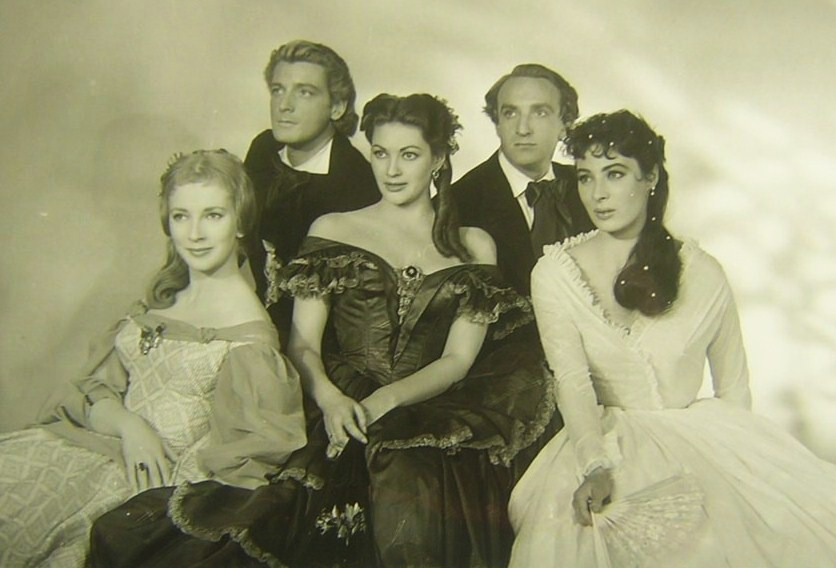
Film still of cast members (from left) Valentina Cortese, Carlos Thompson, Yvonne De Carlo, Alan Badel, and Rita Gam.

Magic Fire is a 1955 American biographical film about the life of composer Richard Wagner, released by Republic Pictures.

Directed by William Dieterle, the film made extensive use of Wagner's music, which was arranged by Erich Wolfgang Korngold. Dieterle worked with Korngold on several Warner Bros. films, including A Midsummer Night's Dream and Juarez. It was one of the final films Republic made in the two-strip color process known as Trucolor.

Although many details about Wagner's life were accurately portrayed, the film often distorted some facts, apparently for dramatic purposes. One high point was the accurate depiction of the riot at the Paris Opera House for the premiere of the revised version of Tannhäuser. The film depicted King Ludwig II's patronage of Wagner, without going into much detail about the king's controversial personality.

The film used a very large cast, opulent sets, and lavish costumes. Since Republic was known primarily for westerns and adventure serials, Magic Fire was one of the rare "prestige" films to be produced by studio chief Herbert Yates. Nevertheless, critical response was mixed and box office receipts in the U.S. were disappointing.

== Plot ==
Conductor Richard Wagner dreams of being a composer. He falls for actress Minna Planer.

== Cast ==
- Alan Badel ... Richard Wagner
- Yvonne De Carlo ... Minna Planer
- Carlos Thompson ... Franz Liszt
- Rita Gam ... Cosima Liszt
- Valentina Cortese ... Mathilde Wesendonck
- Peter Cushing ... Otto Wesendonck
- Frederick Valk ... Minister von Moll
- Gerhard Riedmann ... King Ludwig II
- Erik Schumann ... Hans von Bülow
- Robert Freitag ... August Roeckel
- Heinz Klingenberg ... King of Saxonia
- Charles Régnier ... Giacomo Meyerbeer
- Kurt Großkurth ... Magdeburg Theatre Manager (as Kurt Grosskurth)
- Fritz Rasp ... Pfistermeister
- Hans Quest ... Robert Hubner
- Jan Hendriks ... Mikhail Bakunin
- Erich Wolfgang Korngold ... Hans Richter (uncredited)

== Production ==
The film was based on a book by Bertita Harding published in 1953. It was described as "not strictly biography but not quite fiction.' Harding had written a number of other books in this genre.

Film rights were purchased in 1953 by William Dieterle, who had been interested in a film about Wagner for ten years. Dieterle had directed the film Juarez (1939) based in part on Harding's book The Phantom Crown. Dieterle wrote the script with David Chandler. Harding also worked on the script. Finance was obtained from Republic Pictures. Republic were expanding their production facilities at the time.

Howard Duff and Ida Lupino were originally considered for the leads. Charlton Heston was also discussed. Eventually the lead role went to Alan Badel who had just been in Dieterle's Salome (1953). Support parts went to Carlos Thompson, Rita Gam and Yvonne De Carlo. Thompson was borrowed from MGM.

Filming started in September 1954. The film was shot in Italy and Germany over 12 weeks and wound up in December.

De Carlo had discovered Carlos Thompson in Argentina and had him cast in Fort Algiers. The two had an affair and Thompson owed de Carlo money. Their relationship was over by the time they made this film though.

== Reception ==
Dieterle wanted to make a film about Mozart but it did not happen.

== See also ==
- List of American films of 1955
