= Cagliostro-Walzer =

1875 waltz by Johann Strauss II

Cagliostro-Walzer op.370 is a waltz by Johann Strauss II composed in 1875 based on themes from his operetta, Cagliostro in Wien which premiered on 27 February 1875 at the famous Theater an der Wien.

The waltz principal melody was based on the waltz duet "Könnt' ich mit Ihnen fliegen durchs Leben" or 'Could I but fly with you through life' sung in Act 2 of the operetta. The operetta itself was a success at its first performance and Strauss long adopted the practice of opera composers to draft melodies from their successful stage works to be arranged as a new piece to boost sales of sheet music, thus he composed this 'Cagliostro-Walzer'.

The entire waltz consists of just 3 two-part waltz sections which is also a new Strauss development from the previous 5 two-part sections heard in his earlier works. The piece began with a loud march melody in the C major key before progressing into waltz time. The principal waltz theme in C major is also in the style of The Blue Danube, where three notes in rising melody starts off the waltz proper. Waltz 2A carries the principal key in C major as well but quickly interpolates with a more thoughtful passage in E-flat major. Waltz 3A starts off in F major in a hesitant mood, proceeding into a climax with cymbals. A brief coda enters and the entire Waltz 2B is repeated. After a short chorded passage, the swirling Waltz 1A recurs and Strauss signs off the waltz with a strong chord and long snare-drumroll.
