= Piano Concerto for the Left Hand (Korngold) =

Piano concerto by Erich Wolfgang Korngold

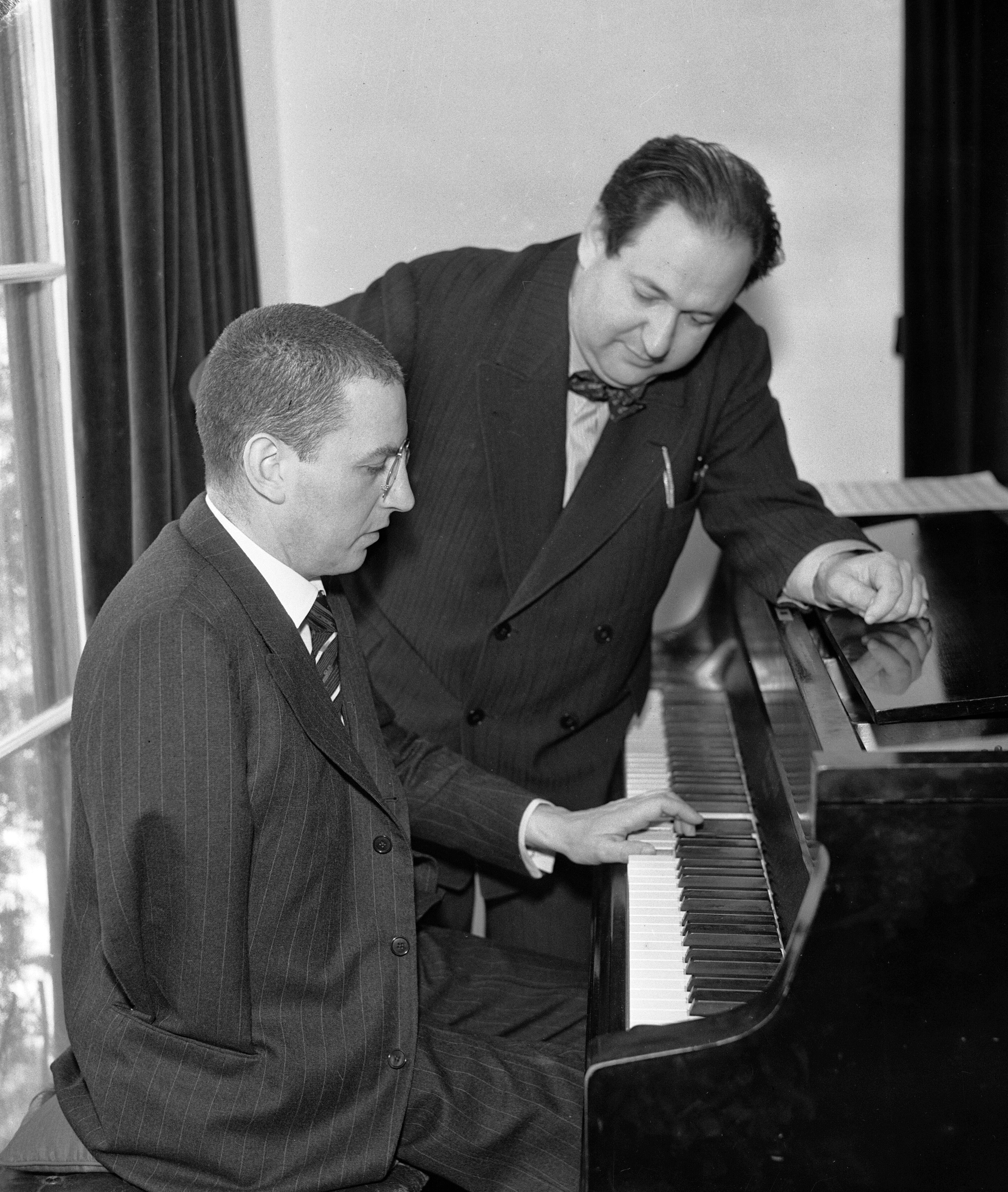
Paul Wittgenstein plays piano with left hand for Erich Wolfgang Korngold, 1934

Erich Wolfgang Korngold's Piano Concerto for the Left Hand in C♯ major, Op. 17, was written on commission from Paul Wittgenstein in 1923, and published in 1926. It was only the second such concerto ever written, after the Concerto in E♭ by Géza Zichy, published in 1895.

== Background ==
Wittgenstein, who lost his right arm in World War I, was later to commission works from composers such as Maurice Ravel, Richard Strauss, Benjamin Britten, Sergei Prokofiev and Paul Hindemith, but Korngold was one of the first composers he approached. At that time, Korngold was the most performed composer in Germany and Austria after Strauss, and, despite being only in his mid-twenties, had already written a number of operas, including his greatest triumph, Die tote Stadt. The concerto was premiered in Vienna on 22 September 1924 with Wittgenstein as soloist and the composer conducting.

In many other cases, Wittgenstein requested certain revisions to the works he commissioned, but not from Korngold. He was so happy with what Korngold wrote that he commissioned a further work, the Suite for 2 violins, cello and piano left-hand, Op. 23.

== Structure ==
The Concerto is cast in one continuous movement, which progresses through various moods and three main sections:

1. Mässiges Zeitmass (Moderate tempo)
2. Heldisch (Heroic)
3. Mit Feuer und Kraft (with fire and power).

The performance duration is approximately 27 minutes.

== Performance and recording history ==
Wittgenstein owned the exclusive performing rights to the Concerto until his death in 1961, and it gradually slipped from the repertoire. It was revived by Gary Graffman, who gave the United Kingdom premiere in 1985, and has since been performed by a number of other pianists.

It has been recorded by Marc-André Hamelin, Howard Shelley, Orion Weiss, Steven de Groote and Nicolas Stavy.

== See also ==
- List of works for piano left-hand and orchestra
