= Die stumme Serenade =

German-language musical comedy

- Musical comedy by Erich Wolfgang Korngold
- Translation: The silent serenade
- Librettist: Victor Clement
- Language: German
- Premiere: 1954; Theater Dortmund

Die stumme Serenade, Op. 36, (The silent serenade), is a German-language musical comedy by Erich Wolfgang Korngold to a libretto by Victor Clement. The style of the work is a mix of operetta and 1920s-style revue songs. The roles are written for eight singers and eight actors and the work is scored for a small chamber orchestra: two pianos, the first doubling on celesta, two violins, cello, flute, clarinet or saxophone, trumpet, and percussion. The plot is set in 1820s Naples. Korngold worked on the piece from 1946 to 1951. A version shortened from 180 to 100 minutes was premiered by Radio Vienna in 1951. The first full version staged in 1954 by Theater Dortmund met with a negative critical response.

== Recordings ==
The recording of the shortened version by Radio Vienna in 1951 featured sopranos Hilde Ceska (Silvia), Rosl Schwaiger (Luise), Liane Synek, mezzo-soprano Tonja Sontis, contralto Hansi Schenk (Probierdamen), baritone Kurt Preger (Caretto), the actors Fred Liewehr (Andrea Cocle), Egon von Jordan (Benedetto), Franz Böheim (Borzalino), Susi Witt (Geschäftsführerin), Felix Dombrowsky (Carlo Marcellini), Herbert Hauk (Pater); conducted by the composer. Issued 2011 by Line Music (cantus classics, CACD 5.01371).

The first full-length recording was made in 2009 with Sarah Wegener, Birger Radde, Frank Buchwald, Werner Klockow, Young Opera Company, Holst-Sinfonietta, Klaus Simon recorded 2009, released by CPO 2011.
