= Cagliostro in Wien =

1875 operetta by Johann Strauss II

Illustration from the 1875 premiere (Die Bombe magazine)

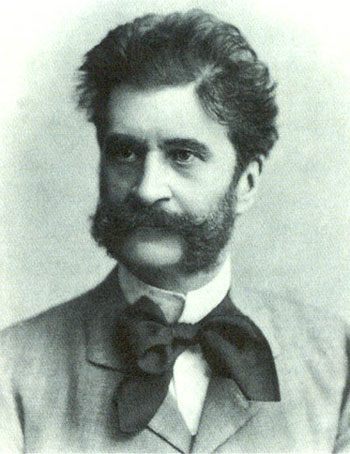
Johann Strauss II

Cagliostro in Wien (Cagliostro in Vienna) is an operetta in three acts by Johann Strauss II to a libretto by F. Zell and Richard Genée. It premiered on 27 February 1875 at the Theater an der Wien, featuring Marie Geistinger and Alexander Girardi.

== Reception ==
The premiere was highly successful, in no small part due to the audience favourite Alexander Girardi (1850–1918) as Blasoni. Another notable performer at the premiere was Marie Geistinger (1836–1903), who had created the role of Rosalinde in Strauss's Die Fledermaus. However, weaknesses in the libretto and—by Strauss's standards—the pallid music, meant the work could not garner the level of long-term public support of the composer's other works. These shortcomings were corrected in a version with a revised libretto by Gustav Quedenfeldt and music by Karl Tutein (who included themes from the Kaiser-Walzer) which premiered on 8 May 1941 in Danzig (Gdańsk).

== Roles ==
Roles, voice types, premiere cast
| Role | Voice type | Premiere cast, 27 February 1875 (Conductor: Johann Strauss II) |
|---|---|---|
| Empress Maria Theresa | soprano | Henriette Wieser |
| Marie Luise, Infanta of Spain | | |
| Baron Sebastian Schnucki, imperial custodian of morals | baritone | Alfred Schreiber |
| Count Cagliostro | baritone | Carl Adolf Friese |
| Lorenza, Italian street singer | soprano | Marie Geistinger |
| Feri von Lieven, Lieutenant | | |
| Frau Adami | | |
| Annemarie, her niece | | |
| Teiglein, pastry cook, Annemarie's guardian | | |
| Blasoni, Count Cagliostro's aide | tenor | Alexander Girardi |
| Severin, owner of a funfair stall | | |
| Innkeeper of The Turk Sconce | | |
| The Hofmarschall | | |
| Beppo and Barberino, Count Cagliostro's aides | | |
Ladies and gentlemen of the court, people, soldiers, police

== Notable arias ==
- "Zigeunerkind, wie glänzt dein Haar" [Gypsy child, how shiny your hair]
- "Die Rose erblüht, wenn die Sonne sie küsst" [The rose will bloom when kissed by the sun]
- "Könnt' ich mit Ihnen fliegen durchs Leben" (Cagliostro Waltz) [Could I but fly with you through life]

== Adaptations ==
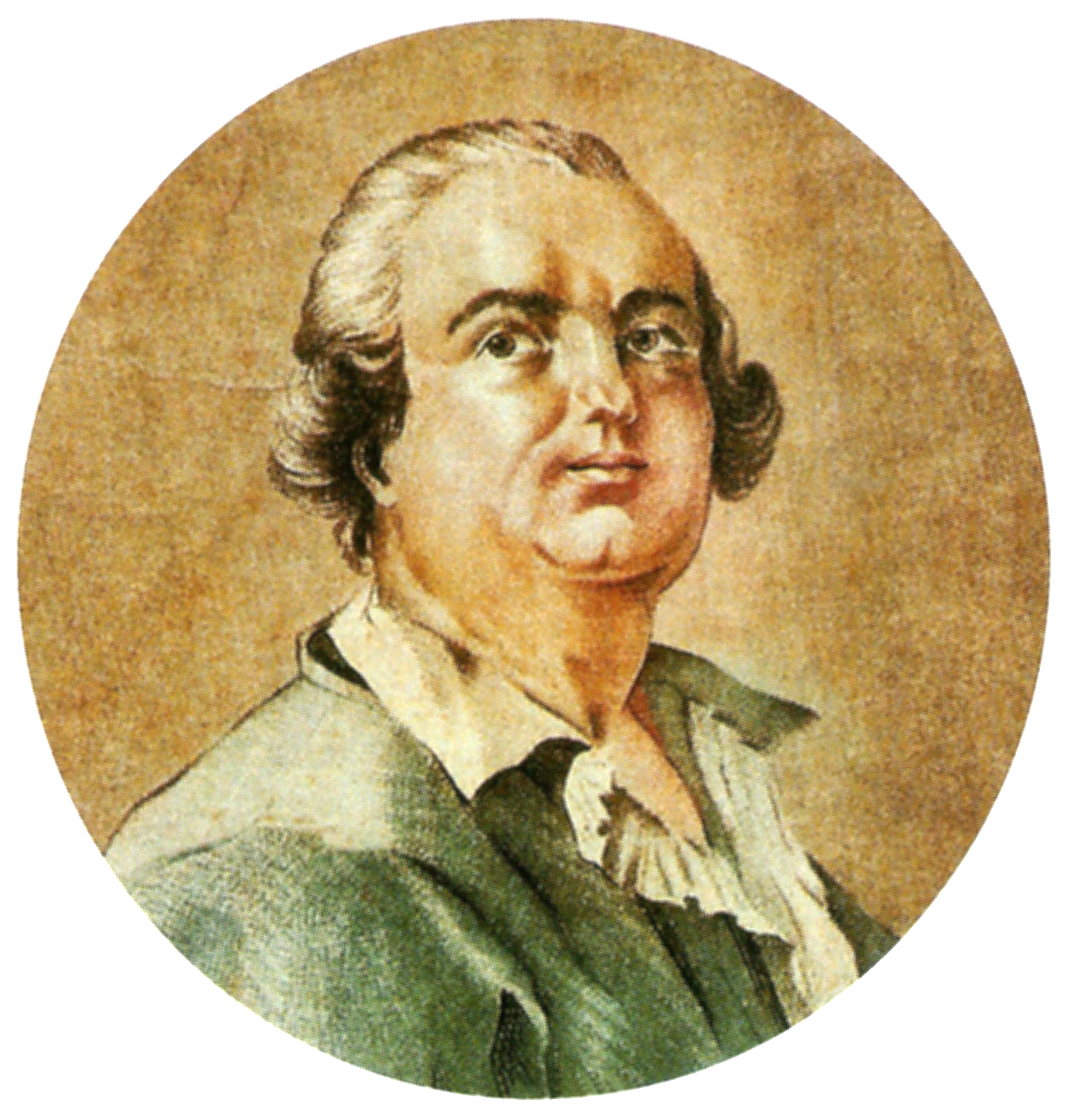
Giuseppe Balsamo (Cagliostro)

Johann Strauss used material from his operetta for the following works:

- Cagliostro-Quadrille, Op. 369 (1875)
- Cagliostro-Walzer, Op. 370 (1875), waltz
- Hoch Österreich, Op. 371 (Hail Austria) (1875), march
- Bitte schön!, Op. 372 (If You Please!) (1875), French polka
- Auf der Jagd, Op. 373 (On the Hunt) (1875), quick polka
- Licht und Schatten, Op. 374 (Light and Shadow) (1875) polka

Erich Wolfgang Korngold wrote an arrangement of the work, first performed on 13 April 1927 in Vienna.
