= George Korngold =

Austrian record producer

George Korngold (December 17, 1928 – November 25, 1987) was a prominent Austrian-born American record producer as well as a music editor and producer active within the film industry. He was the younger son of Austrian composer Erich Wolfgang Korngold.

Korngold was born in Vienna, Austria in 1928. His father first went to Hollywood in 1934 to work on the Max Reinhardt production of A Midsummer Night's Dream, and travelled to and from Vienna for the next several years. During this time, George remained in Vienna: it was not until February 1938 that George arrived in the United States with his parents for the scoring of Robin Hood, and after the Anschluss in March and the emergency arrival of his older brother Ernst with his grandparents the family permanently remained in Los Angeles.

Reports that Korngold attended the Vienna Academy of Music are thus mysterious: at the time he left Vienna, he was not yet ten years old. However, since Erich Korngold taught at the Academy throughout the early 1930s, it is thought possible that the young boy was permitted to be present in classes.

As a record producer, Korngold was much involved with film music, in the 1970s co-producing (with Charles Gerhardt) the 14-volume Classic Film Scores Series for RCA Records. He also produced a series of 'landmark' recordings of his father's works, including the operas Die tote Stadt (for RCA) and Violanta (for CBS) and a disc of the First and Third String Quartets (for RCA; played by the Chilingirian Quartet). In 1979, he produced one of the first digital audio recordings, for Chalfont Records; it was the first commercial release of his father's music for Kings Row, Charles Gerhardt conducting.

In Hollywood, Korngold worked as a music editor on a number of high-profile films, including the big-budget The Fall of the Roman Empire (1964), Fedora (1978), The Fury (1978) and Outland (1981).

Korngold died in Los Angeles, California in 1987.
