= Erich Wolfgang Korngold =

Austrian-born American composer and conductor (1897–1957)

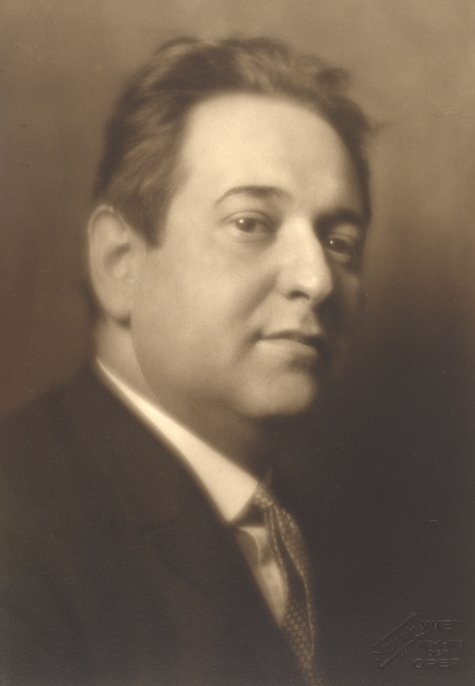
- Korngold c. 1927
- Born: May 29, 1897; Brünn, Moravia, Austria-Hungary
- Died: November 29, 1957 (aged 60); Los Angeles, California
- Citizenship: Austria; United States (from 1943)
- Occupations: Composer; conductor; pianist
- Years active: 1909–1957
- Known for: Operas, film scores, symphonic and chamber music
- Spouse: Luise von Sonnenthal (m. 1924)

Erich Wolfgang Korngold (German: [ˈeːʁɪç ˈvɔlfɡaŋ ˈkɔʁnɡɔlt]; May 29, 1897 – November 29, 1957) was an Austrian composer and conductor, who left Europe in the mid-1930s and later adopted US nationality. A child prodigy, he became one of the most important and influential composers in Hollywood history. He was a noted pianist and composer of classical music, along with music for Hollywood films, and the first composer of international stature to write Hollywood scores.

When he was 11, his ballet Der Schneemann (The Snowman) became a sensation in Vienna; his Second Piano Sonata, which he wrote at age 13, was played throughout Europe by Artur Schnabel. His one-act operas Violanta and Der Ring des Polykrates were premiered in Munich in 1916, conducted by Bruno Walter. At 23, his opera Die tote Stadt (The Dead City) premiered in Hamburg and Cologne. In 1921 he conducted the Hamburg Opera. During the 1920s he re-orchestrated, re-arranged and nearly re-composed several operettas by Johann Strauss II. By 1931 he was a professor of music at the Vienna State Academy.

At the request of motion picture director Max Reinhardt, and due to the rise of the Nazi regime, Korngold moved to Hollywood in 1934 to write music for films. His first was Reinhardt's A Midsummer Night's Dream (1935). He subsequently wrote scores for such films as Captain Blood (1935), which helped boost the career of its starring newcomer, Errol Flynn. His score for Anthony Adverse (1936) won an Oscar; two years later he won another Oscar for The Adventures of Robin Hood (1938).

Korngold scored 16 Hollywood films in all, and received two more nominations for Oscars. Along with Max Steiner and Alfred Newman, he is one of the founders of American film music. Although his late-Romantic style of classical composition was no longer as popular when he died in 1957, his music underwent a resurgence of interest in the 1970s beginning with the release of the RCA Red Seal album The Sea Hawk: The Classic Film Scores of Erich Wolfgang Korngold (1972). This album, produced by his son George Korngold, was hugely popular and ignited interest in his other film music (and that of other classic film composers), as well as in his concert music, which often incorporates popular themes from his film scores (an example being the Violin Concerto in D, Op. 35, which incorporates themes from four of his motion picture scores and has become part of the standard repertoire).

== Biography ==
=== Early years as a prodigy ===
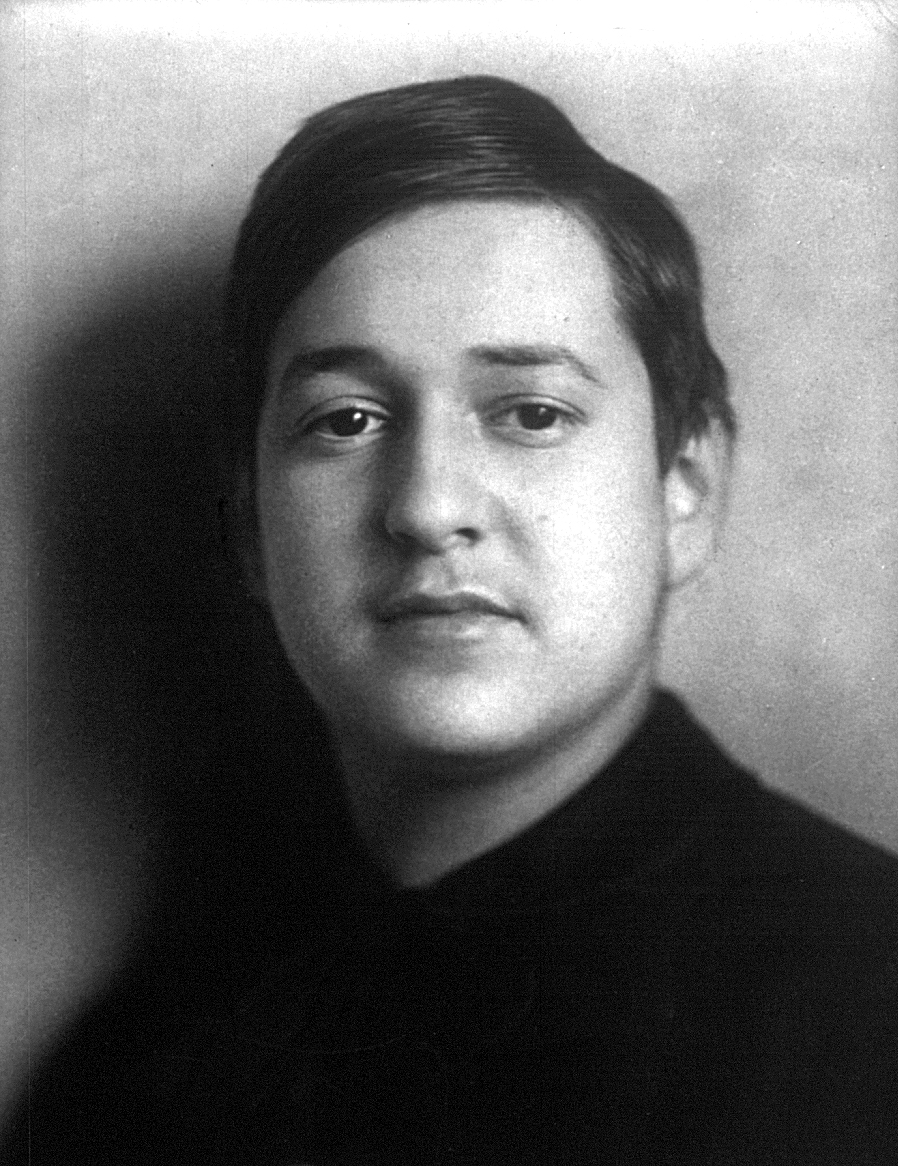
Korngold (undated, c. 1912)

Erich Wolfgang Korngold was born to a Jewish family in Brünn, Austria-Hungary (present-day Brno, Czech Republic). Erich was the second son of eminent music critic (Leopold) Julius Korngold (1860–1945); his older brother, Hans Robert Korngold (1892–1965), also became a musician. A child prodigy living in Vienna, Erich could play four-hand piano arrangements alongside his father at age five. He was also able to reproduce any melody he heard on the piano, along with playing complete and elaborate chords. By age seven, he was writing original music.

Korngold played his cantata Gold for Gustav Mahler in 1906; Mahler called him a "musical genius" and recommended he study with composer Alexander von Zemlinsky. Richard Strauss also spoke highly of the youth, and along with Mahler told Korngold's father there was no benefit in having his son enroll in a music conservatory since his abilities were already years ahead of what he could learn there.

At age 11, he composed his ballet Der Schneemann (The Snowman), which became a sensation when performed at the Vienna Court Opera in 1910, including a command performance for Emperor Franz Josef. He continued composing with great success throughout his teens. At age 12, he composed a piano trio. His Piano Sonata No. 2 in E major, which followed, was played throughout Europe by Artur Schnabel. During these early years he also made live-recording player piano music rolls for the Hupfeld DEA and Phonola system and also the Aeolian Duo-Art system, which survive today and can be heard.

Korngold wrote his first orchestral score, the Schauspiel-Ouvertüre, when he was 14. His Sinfonietta appeared the following year, and his first two operas, Der Ring des Polykrates and Violanta, in 1914. In 1916, he wrote songs, chamber works, and incidental music, including to Much Ado About Nothing, which ran for some 80 performances in Vienna.

=== Composing career in Europe ===
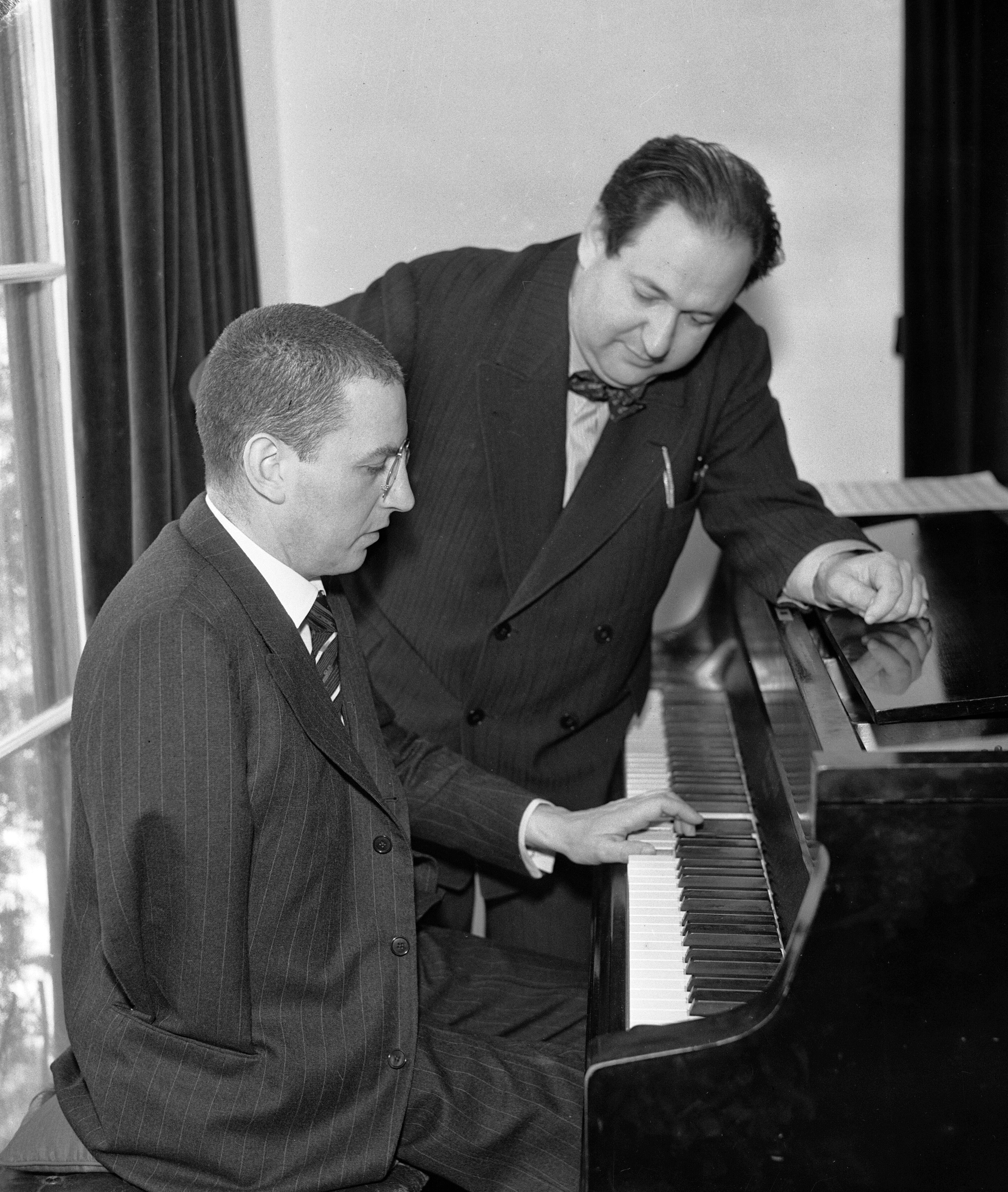
Paul Wittgenstein plays piano with left hand for Korngold, 1934

Korngold was active in the theatre throughout Europe while in his 20s. After the success of his opera Die tote Stadt, which he conducted in many opera houses, he developed a passion for the music of Johann Strauss II and managed to exhume a number of lost scores. He orchestrated and staged them using new concepts. Both A Night in Venice and Cagliostro in Vienna are Korngold re-creations; these were the works that first drew the attention of Max Reinhardt to Korngold.

By this point Korngold had reached the zenith of his fame as a composer of opera and concert music. Composers such as Richard Strauss and Giacomo Puccini heaped praise upon him, and many famous conductors, soloists and singers added his works to their repertoires. He began collaborating with Reinhardt on many productions, including a collection of little-known Strauss pieces that they arranged, Waltzes From Vienna. It was retitled The Great Waltz and became the basis for a 1934 British film directed by Alfred Hitchcock and a film by the same name in the US, starring Luise Rainer. Korngold conducted staged versions in Los Angeles in 1949 and 1953.

He completed a Concerto for Piano Left Hand for pianist Paul Wittgenstein in 1923 and his fourth opera, Das Wunder der Heliane, four years later. He started arranging and conducting operettas by Johann Strauss II and others while teaching opera and composition at the Vienna Staatsakademie. Korngold was awarded the title professor honoris causa by the president of Austria.

=== Composer for Hollywood films ===
==== A Midsummer Night's Dream (1935) ====
After Max Reinhardt's success in producing Shakespeare's A Midsummer Night's Dream for the stage, using incidental music by Felix Mendelssohn, he invited Korngold to Hollywood in 1934 to adapt Mendelssohn's score for his planned film version. Korngold would also enlarge and conduct the score.

The film, which was released in 1935, was a first for Warner Brothers studio in producing a film based on a 400-year-old work of literary art. The studio assigned almost every star or character actor under contract to take part in the film, with the filming taking over six months. The studio also allowed Korngold to devote more attention to the score than it had to any of its previous films; he could prerecord certain parts of the film for the benefit of actors, whom he then had act to the rhythm and tempo of the music. As a result of the score's elaborate tailoring, the film and Korngold's music left a strong impression on the film industry.

Korngold returned to Austria to finish Die Kathrin. He came back to Hollywood to score the film Give Us This Night, with lyricist Oscar Hammerstein II, a film which introduced mezzo-soprano Gladys Swarthout and the Polish-born tenor Jan Kiepura, who had starred in several Korngold operas in Europe.

==== Captain Blood (1935) ====
In 1935 Warners asked Korngold if he was interested in writing an original dramatic score for Captain Blood. He at first declined, feeling that a story about pirates was outside his range of interest. However, after watching the filming, with a dynamic new star, Errol Flynn, in an heroic role alongside Olivia de Havilland, who had her debut in A Midsummer Night's Dream, he changed his mind.

Korngold not only had the background but also had the gift of melody, an innate sense of theater, and the skills to manipulate sentiment, emotion, humor, and excitement. In short, if Jack L. Warner had been praying for such a composer, then his prayers had been answered.

— film historian Tony Thomas

After he accepted, however, he learned that he needed to compose over an hour of symphonic music in only three weeks. The short time frame forced him to use bits of symphonic poems by Franz Liszt, and a couple of engaging cues were written by Korngold orchestrator Milan Roder. In the end, Korngold insisted he be credited only with musical adaptations, even though he scored nearly the entire film with original music.

Captain Blood became an immediate hit, with an Oscar nomination for the score. As Korngold's first fully symphonic film score, it marked a milestone in his career, as he became the first composer of international stature to sign a contract with a film studio. It also launched the career of Flynn and gave a major boost to that of de Havilland, who did another seven movies with Flynn. Korngold scored six more films starring Flynn. In addition, Captain Blood opened the way for other costumed romantic adventures, which hadn't been seen since the silent era.

==== Anthony Adverse (1936) ====
After scoring Anthony Adverse, another Warners picture, this one starring Fredric March and Olivia de Havilland, Korngold's career in Hollywood developed quickly. He finally became convinced that dramatic scoring went well with certain types of films. The film, which is set in mid-18th century Italy, the Alps, and France, received an expensive treatment from Warners, which pleased him greatly.

Korngold was awarded his first Academy Award for the Anthony Adverse score. In this film, the first half hour contains continuous scoring and proved to be a major step forward in the art of film scoring. Korngold conceived his film scores as "operas without singing."

==== The Adventures of Robin Hood (1938) ====
In 1938, Korngold was conducting opera in Austria when he was asked by Warner Brothers to return to Hollywood and compose a score for The Adventures of Robin Hood (1938), starring Errol Flynn and Olivia de Havilland. The film, based on a largely fictional English legend, is considered the finest of its kind, with a continuous series of romantic and adventurous sequences propelled by Korngold's dynamic score. Music historian Laurence E. MacDonald notes that there were many factors which made the film a success, including its cast, its Technicolor photography and fast-paced direction by Michael Curtiz, but "most of all, there is Korngold's glorious music." And film historian Rudy Behlmer describes Korngold's contribution to this and his other films:

Korngold's score was a splendid added dimension. His style for the Flynn swashbucklers resembled that of the creators of late nineteenth-century and early twentieth-century German symphonic tone poems. It incorporated chromatic harmonies, lush instrumental effects, passionate climaxes—all performed in a generally romantic manner. Korngold's original and distinctive style was influenced by the Wagnerian leitmotif, the orchestral virtuosity of Richard Strauss, the delicacy and broad melodic sweep of Puccini, and the long-line development of Gustav Mahler.

Before Korngold began composing the score, Austria was invaded by Germany and annexed by the Nazis. His home in Vienna was confiscated by the Nazis. Because all Jews in Austria were now at risk, Korngold stayed in America until the end of World War II. He later said, "We thought of ourselves as Viennese; Hitler made us Jewish."

Korngold noted that the opportunity to compose the score for Robin Hood saved his life. It also gave him his second Academy Award for Best Original Score and established the symphonic style that would later be used in action films during Hollywood's Golden Age. Modern day epics such as the Star Wars and Indiana Jones trilogies similarly included original symphonic scores. Composer John Williams has cited Korngold as his inspiration in scoring the Star Wars series.

==== Juarez (1939) ====
Korngold was interested in writing a score for Juarez, as it involved historical figures from Mexico and Austria. It dealt with the Mexican politician Benito Juarez but also involved the story of Archduke Maximilian von Habsburg and his wife, Carlotta. Korngold was moved by the true-life story of how Louis Napoleon, seeing America engulfed by Civil War, took advantage of that fact and attempted, in 1864, to control Mexico. He appointed Maximilian as its emperor.

All of the music written at that time was strictly Viennese. The European influence was so strong in Mexico during that time that native composers, either consciously or in an unconscious effort to court the favor of the rulers, abandoned their native style and copied that of [Johann] Strauss.

— Erich Korngold

After the United States demanded that France divest itself of its interests in Mexico, the Austrian aristocrat was left to his fate, and he was executed by the Juarez government. The dramatic accent of the film leaned in favor of Maximilian and Carlotta, however, aided greatly by Korngold's poignant themes for them.

Korngold researched the music popular in Mexico at the time and realized it was not Mexican but "unmistakenly Viennese." He composed 3,000 bars of music for the score, at times emulating the rhythms of Frédéric Chopin and Franz Schubert, and the second theme of the first movement of his Violin Concerto was drawn from his work for the film. Maximilian and Carlotta loved the Mexican song "La Paloma," and Korngold used it effectively during the score.

==== The Private Lives of Elizabeth and Essex (1939) ====
Korngold was again nominated for his score of The Private Lives of Elizabeth and Essex. The score is essentially operatic, with lush background music throughout, a rousing march theme for Essex (Errol Flynn), and one of his "most noble and heroic melodies" for the theme "Elizabeth, The Queen", Elizabeth (Bette Davis) An hour of the hour and half long film is supported by the score, composed of rich dramatic and romantic themes.

He chose not to use any period music or to approximate 16th-century musical sounds, explaining:

The loves and hates of the two main characters, the ideas expressed by the playwright generally, while taken from history, are symbolic. It is a play of eternally true principles and motives of love and ambition, as recurrent today as three hundred years ago.

The score concentrates on the regal Main Title, the triumphal entry march of Essex into London, the Queen's theme, and the recapitulation of that theme in the End Titles.

==== The Sea Hawk (1940) ====
The Sea Hawk was Korngold's last score for swashbuckler films, all of which had starred Errol Flynn. It is widely regarded as one of Korngold's best. The film ran two hours and six minutes and was one of the longest films he ever worked on. It includes symphonic score in all but twenty minutes. It was also his tenth original score in less than six years.

Of the final duel between Thorpe (Errol Flynn) and Wolfingham (Henry Daniell), MacDonald states that "Korngold's breathlessly fast-paced music helps to make this one of the most exciting swordfights in cinema history", while Behlmer describes the duel scene as a "tour de force of rhythmic energy and exactitude."

==== The Sea Wolf (1941) ====
In scoring The Sea Wolf, based on a novel by Jack London, Korngold's film career went in a different direction. In this film, the score reflects an evil atmosphere, dark images, and the tense emotions of its crew during an unfortunate voyage. Edward G. Robinson, as Wolf Larsen, plays a tormented and brutal captain of a sealing schooner, which gets crippled by a rival ship.

To support the complex atmosphere, with its scenes of the fog-shrouded voyage, Korngold created a score that was understated, which was very different from his swashbucklers. He often used sharp brass chords with swirling configurations, along with a love theme voiced by a harmonica. Music historian Thomas S. Hischak notes some aspects of the score:

Korngold's score for The Sea Wolf is not only quieter but actually somber and, at times, dissonant. The opening theme captures the chaos of the wilderness in the North but soon the score seems to be enveloped in a fog (as are the characters) and everything becomes morose and haunting.

==== Kings Row (1942) ====
The score for Kings Row (1942) has been compared to those of films like Gone with the Wind and Anthony Adverse, which also had powerful theme motifs. Those stories were based on recent best-selling novels, as was Kings Row. In this score, Korngold moved even further away from his previous romantic and swashbuckler styles. This was Korngold's most Gothic film score, and a film which film historian Tony Thomas has called a "true American classic." He adds that the score "might well have been the basis for an opera or a grandly scaled symphonic poem."

The story is set in a Midwestern US town (Kings Row), where the characters portray a wide range of psychological emotions, from loves and hates, bitterness, tenderness and torment. Combined with Korngold's score, which some claim is among his finest, the film drew an unusually high level of public interest and acclaim. Its costar, future President Ronald Reagan, considered his performance the best of his career.

The score contains a main theme which is varied throughout the film, depending on the how each scene develops. MacDonald states that the main theme is a "majestic and noble melody that immediately grabs the viewer's attention" when the film begins. By using this motif, the theme connects the entire score, which often left a strong impact on viewers.

British composer Harold Truscott, for example, who saw the film when he was 28, wrote to Korngold admiring the score. He also saw the film more than thirty times just to hear the score, sometimes with his eyes completely closed. Like Gone with the Wind, Kings Row concludes with the main theme hymned operatically by an unseen chorus.

==== Later scores: 1943–1956 ====
Kings Row was followed by seven film scores in four years – The Constant Nymph (1943), Between Two Worlds (1944), Devotion (1946), Of Human Bondage (1946), Deception (1946), Escape Me Never (1947), and Adventures of Don Juan (1948) (unused score).

World War II prevented Korngold from returning to Europe. He became an American citizen in 1943 and remained in the US after retiring from film composing in 1947.

He spent the last ten years of his life composing concert pieces, including a Violin Concerto, a Symphonic Serenade for strings, a Cello Concerto and a Symphony. The Violin Concerto has become particularly successful, with many recordings and performances following Jascha Heifetz's initial version.

His final complete orchestral work was Straussiana (1953), commissioned by a US publisher as a work suitable for school orchestra. It has three movements, based on works by Johann Strauss II: a polka from the operetta 'Fürstin Ninetta', a mazurka based on a polka from Cagliostro in Wien, and a waltz from the operetta Ritter Pásmán. Korngold superstitiously refused to give it an opus number. A typical performance lasts about seven and a half minutes.

He returned to film scoring one more time, shortly before his death, for Magic Fire (1955), a film biography of the composer Richard Wagner. He was asked to adapt the music of Wagner for most of the film, but Korngold also wrote some original music for it. He is seen during the final scenes in an unbilled cameo as the conductor Hans Richter.

=== Death ===
Korngold lived at 9936 Toluca Lake Avenue, Toluca Lake, Los Angeles, a few blocks from Warner Brothers Studio, where he worked. In October 1956 he suffered a severe stroke and although he partially recovered, he "endured many physical and emotional difficulties" before his death at the age of 60, on November 29 the following year. He was survived by his wife, Luzi (Luise), two sons, George Korngold and Ernst Korngold; his mother, Josephine Korngold; a brother, Hans Robert Korngold, and three grandchildren. He was interred at Hollywood Forever Cemetery. At the time of his death, he was working on his sixth opera.

== Composing techniques and style ==
His strong points are lyrical melody, rich textures and virtuoso orchestration; the music has a strong sense of the theatre and of theatrical effectiveness, but is deficient in contrapuntal vitality. His emotional directness and lack of inhibition, his unashamedly grand manner and the sheer exuberance of his invention breathed new life into a moribund tradition and have ensured the renewed and growing interest in his work which the last few years have witnessed.

— The New Grove Dictionary of Opera (1992)

Korngold approached his scoring theatrically, and could only write by regarding film scenarios as opera libretti. This made him prefer to write leitmotifs for each of the main characters in a film, and vary them based on the emotional level of a scene. He felt that by having "musical identifications for characters, places, and even abstract ideas in a film," it would help keep characters straight in the minds of the audience. Music motifs were commonly used by other film composers during that period, including Max Steiner.

During Captain Blood, for instance, motifs were created for phases of Captain Blood's career as a pirate, using different instrumentation. Variations of some type of brass instrument were heard, such as when the ship readies for voyage, or to lend solemnity to someone's death. A full reiteration of the motif is reserved for a climactic battle scene. The impact of the score for Captain Blood led Gene Roddenberry, creator of Star Trek, to tell his composer to use that film as an archetypal example of the kind of sound he wanted for his series. According to Karlin and Wright in On the Track:

The development of motifs is a powerful compositional device for the film composer, allowing him to bring an overall sense of unity to his score and still leave room for variety.

Korngold composed in the evenings while at the piano, as he watched scenes from the film that an assigned projectionist would run for him. He would run scenes repeatedly as he improvised the music. He would collect his ideas and concepts and later commit them to paper.

During his years scoring films, he still composed some non-film works, such as Passover Psalm, Opus 30, for chorus and orchestra (1941); Prayer, Opus 32 for chorus and orchestra (1942); and Tomorrow When You Have Gone, Opus 33, for chorus and orchestra (1942). In 1946 he composed an opera, Die stumme Serenade, which he recorded privately hoping to attract interest in making a full production. On the never-released private recording, he can be heard humming as he played the piano.

In the studio during the day, he worked with orchestrators, such as Hugo Friedhofer, with whom he would make elaborate sketches marking out exactly what he wanted. He once told Friedhofer that he felt Tosca was the best film score ever written. With the orchestra in session, Korngold would conduct.

Korngold biographer Brendan G. Carrol describes Korngold's style and methods:

Treating each film as an 'opera without singing' (each character has his or her own leitmotif) [Korngold] created intensely romantic, richly melodic and contrapuntally intricate scores, the best of which are a cinematic paradigm for the tone poems of Richard Strauss and Franz Liszt. He intended that, when divorced from the moving image, these scores could stand alone in the concert hall. His style exerted a profound influence on modern film music.

== Personal life ==
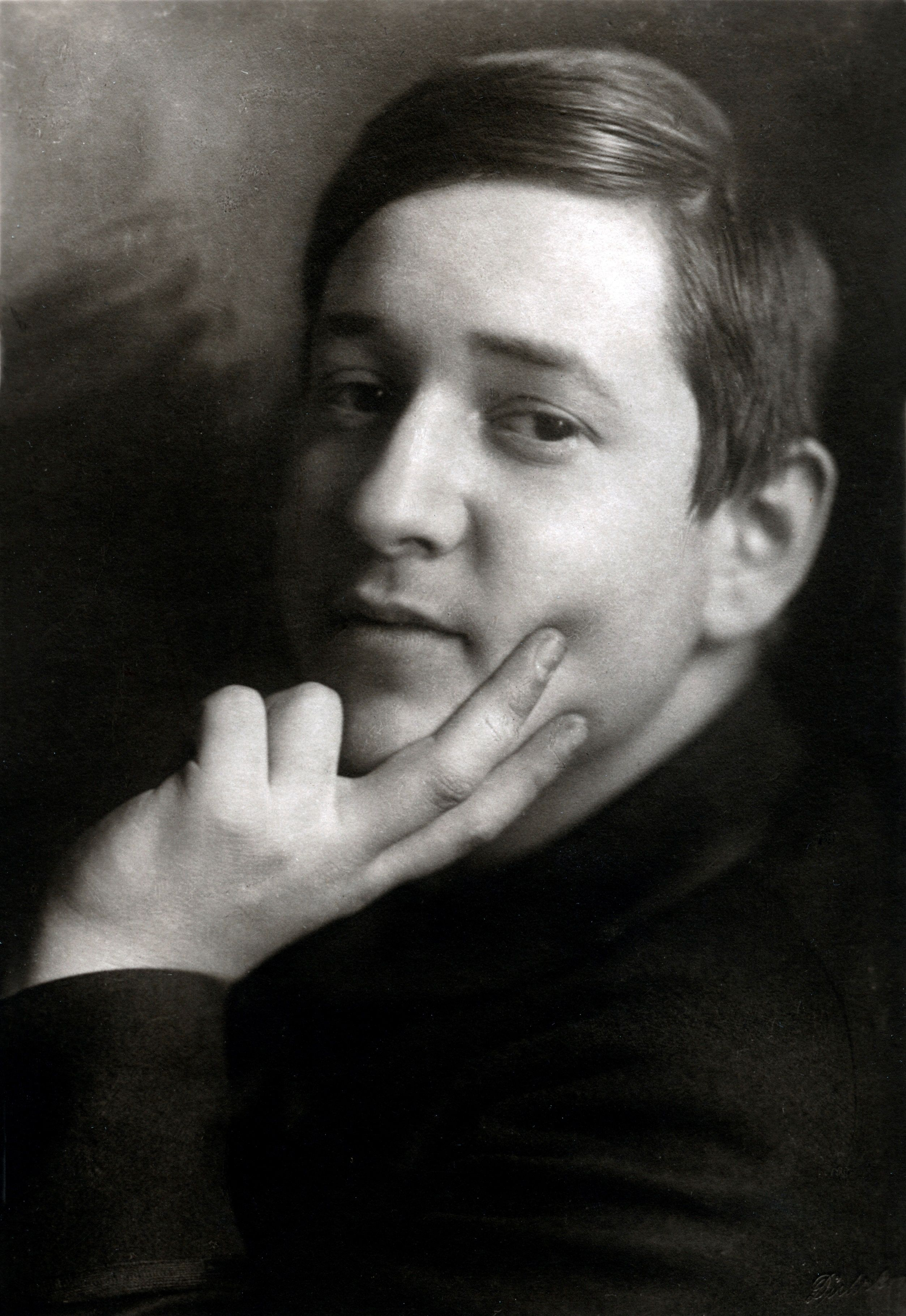
Korngold (undated, c. 1920)

In 1924, Korngold married Luzi von Sonnenthal (1900–1962), granddaughter of actor Adolf von Sonnenthal, an actress, writer, singer and pianist, with whom he had fallen in love at age 19. They had two children, Ern[e]st Werner and Georg[e] Wolfgang. Luzi's biography of her husband was published in 1967.

In 1943, Korngold became a naturalized citizen of the United States. The year 1945 became an important turning point in his life. His father, who had never been entirely comfortable in Los Angeles, and who had never approved of Erich's decision to work exclusively on film composition, died after a lengthy illness.

Around the same time, World War II in Europe drew to an end. At this stage in his career Korngold had grown increasingly disillusioned with Hollywood and with the kinds of pictures he was being given, and he was eager to return to writing music for the concert hall and the stage.

== Legacy ==
Korngold was a master film composer. His wonderful melodies, orchestrated in the most gorgeous Richard Strauss-oriented manner, are a joy to hear, even when the films are forgettable. Robin Hood, The Sea Hawk, and Elizabeth and Essex all display Korngold's musical extravertism, and for some reason, his unmistakable Viennese kind of sentiment helped Errol Flynn be a convincing English hero.

— Composer André Previn

Despite his achievements, Korngold for years attracted little positive critical attention. In 1972, RCA Victor released an LP titled The Sea Hawk: The Classic Film Scores of Erich Wolfgang Korngold, featuring excerpts performed by the National Philharmonic Orchestra. This was followed by recordings of Korngold's operas and concert works, which led to performances of his Symphony in F-sharp major and concertos, as well as other compositions. Following the success of the Korngold album, the Classic Film Scores series was extended through thirteen additional discs, including a second Korngold collection. These records have been credited with inspiring the revival of symphonic music in films, most prominently in the Star Wars series, which features prominent allusions to Korngold's style.

Productions of Die tote Stadt were mounted at the Vienna Volksoper in 1967 and the New York City Opera in 1975.

The American Film Institute ranked Korngold's score for The Adventures of Robin Hood as number 11 on their list of the greatest film scores. His scores for the following films were also nominated for the list:

- The Private Lives of Elizabeth and Essex (1939)
- The Sea Hawk (1940)
- Kings Row (1942)
- Deception (1946)

Further recognition came in the 1990s; two full-scale biographies of him appeared almost simultaneously. One is Jessica Duchen's Erich Wolfgang Korngold. The other is Brendan G. Carroll's Erich Korngold: The Last Prodigy. Carroll is President of the International Korngold Society. Carroll released excerpts of acetates with Korngold conducting the Warner Bros. studio orchestra in music from his film scores, some possibly taken from KFWB radio broadcasts.

In 2019 the Bard Music Festival (at Bard College, New York) celebrated Korngold with an extensive series of performances and lectures and the publication of Korngold and His World, edited by Daniel Goldmark and Kevin C. Karnes. In addition, Bard sponsored the first US production of Das Wunder der Heliane — more than ninety years after its premiere.

In 2008 Gary Noland wrote a string trio Korngoldaroonie in tribute to Korngold.

== Selected recordings ==
- In 1973, Warner Brothers released special LPs featuring excerpts from the original soundtracks of films scored by Korngold, as well as a rare recording of Korngold playing the main theme from Kings Row on the piano.
- "Korngold: The Sea Hawk / The Private Lives of Elizabeth and Essex / Captain Blood / The Prince and the Pauper", conductor André Previn, Deutsche Grammophon
- KFWB radio broadcast from 1938 with Korngold conducting the studio orchestra in excerpts from The Adventures of Robin Hood, narrated by actor Basil Rathbone, was released on LP.
- The National Symphony Orchestra released a recording of the score of King's Row [when].

There have also been a number of new digital recordings of Korngold's film scores, as well as some of his concert works:

- Violin concerto and his symphony in 2013, which was given its first Proms performance, at the Royal Albert Hall in London.
- RCA Victor was the first to record a complete Korngold opera (in stereo), in 1975: Die tote Stadt, conducted by Erich Leinsdorf in Germany.
- In 1980, CBS Masterworks recorded the opera Violanta under the baton of Marek Janowski; this recording has been re-released by Sony Classical in 2009.
- In 1993, Decca released a recording of Das Wunder der Heliane.
- Korngold's two remaining operas, Der Ring des Polykrates and Die Kathrin have both been recorded (in 1996 and 1998 respectively) by the German record label CPO.
- American conductor-pianist Alexander Frey has recorded Korngold's complete original piano works.
- In 2001, ArtHaus Musik released on DVD (UPC 807280036398) a documentary titled Erich Wolfgang Korngold – The Adventures of a Wunderkind (also Between Two Worlds), directed by Barrie Gavin, in the Composers of Our Time series.
- The Korngold Violin Concerto was recorded in 2006 by Bramwell Tovey and the Vancouver Symphony Orchestra, with James Ehnes as violinist, on a Grammy Award-winning album that included Concertos by Walton and Barber.
- Double bass soloist Joel Quarrington recorded a transcription of the "Garden Scene" from Korngold's incidental music to Much Ado About Nothing, Op. 11 on his 2008 CD, also entitled "Garden Scene". Quarrington won a Juno Award for the album.
- In 2009, Korngold's Violin Concerto was released on the Naxos Records label, along with Overture to a Drama, Op. 4, and the concert suite from Much Ado About Nothing, performed by the Orquesta Sinfonica de Mineria and violinist Philippe Quint.
- In 2013, the Adamas Quartett recorded String Quartet No. 2, Op. 26 (Gramola 2013), awarded among others Diapason découverte" and "Pasticcio Prize".
- In 2022, Naxos released Korngold's complete incidental music, which consists of music written for a 1920 Vienna production of Much Ado About Nothing, and for Hans Müller-Einigen's play Der Vampyr, oder Die Gejagten (The Vampire, or the Hunted).

== Selected list of works ==
- Piano Sonata No. 1 in D minor with concluding passacaglia (composed 1908; first performed 1908/09)
- Piano Trio in D major, Op. 1 (composed and first performed 1910)
- Piano Sonata No. 2 in E major, Op. 2, in four movements (composed 1910; first performed 1911)
- Schauspiel-Ouvertüre (Overture to a Play), Op. 4 (Composed and first performed 1911)
- Sinfonietta, Op. 5 (Composed 1912, orchestrated and first performed 1913)
- Violin Sonata in G major, Op. 6 (composed 1912; first performed 1916)
- Der Ring des Polykrates, Op. 7 (opera) (1916)
- Violanta, Op. 8 (opera) (1916)
- Einfache Lieder, Op. 9 (1911–16)
- String Sextet in D major, Op. 10 (1914–16; first performed 1917)
- Much Ado About Nothing, Op. 11 (Incidental music to the play by Shakespeare, composed 1918–1919, first performed 1920)
- Die tote Stadt, Op. 12 (opera) (1920)
- Sursum Corda, Op. 13 (symphonic overture) (Composed 1919, first performed 1920)
- Quintet for two violins, viola, cello and piano in E major, Op. 15 (composed 1920–21; first performed 1923)
- String Quartet No. 1 in A major, Op. 16 (composed 1923; first performed 1924)
- Piano Concerto in C♯ for the left hand alone, Op. 17, (Composed 1923, first performed 1924)
- Das Wunder der Heliane, Op. 20 (opera) (1927)
- Suite for 2 violins, cello and piano left hand, Op. 23, composed 1930; first performed 1930
- Piano Sonata No. 3 in C major, Op. 25 (composed 1931; first performed 1932)
- String Quartet No. 2 in E♭ major, Op. 26 (composed 1933; first performed 1934)
- Die Kathrin, Op. 28 (opera) (1939)
- Tomorrow, Op. 33, tone poem for mezzo-soprano, women's choir and orchestra, for the movie The Constant Nymph. (First performed in concert 1944)
- String Quartet No. 3 in D major, Op. 34 (composed 1945; first performed 1949)
- Violin Concerto, Op. 35 (Composed 1945, first performed 1947)
- Die stumme Serenade, Op. 36 (musical comedy) (1954)
- Cello Concerto in C major, Op. 37 (Composed 1950, expanded from a work written for the 1946 film Deception)
- Symphonic Serenade in B♭ major for string orchestra, Op. 39 (Composed 1947–48, first performed 1950)
- Symphony in F♯ major, Op. 40 (Composed 1947–52, first performed 1954)
- Theme and Variations, Op. 42 (composed and first performed 1953)

== See also ==
- The Holocaust in Austria
- List of Austrians in music
- Vugesta

== Bibliography ==
- The Last Prodigy: A Biography of Erich Wolfgang Korngold by Brendan G. Carroll; ISBN 978-1-57467-029-5 (Hardcover, October 1997)
- Das Letzte Wunderkind by Brendan G Carroll. Boehlau-Verlag, Vienna; ISBN 978-3-20577-716-8 (Hardcover, June 2008); revised edition of 1997 biography in German translation
- Erich Wolfgang Korngold (20th-Century Composers) by Jessica Duchen. Phaidon Publication; ISBN 0-7148-3155-7 (Paperback, July 1996)
- Erich Wolfgang Korngold by Luzi Korngold (wife). Verlag Elisabeth Lafite, Vienna, 1967 (in German)
- "Erich Wolfgang Korngold: early life and works". Doctoral thesis by David Ian Kram. Monash University, Melbourne, Australia
- Carroll, Brendan G. (2020) [2001]. "Korngold, Erich Wolfgang". In Winters, Ben (ed.). Grove Music Online. Oxford: Oxford University Press. doi:10.1093/omo/9781561592630.013.3000000199. ISBN 978-1-56159-263-0. (subscription, Wikilibrary access, or UK public library membership required)
- Caspar Wintermans: Een jongen van brutale zwier: Erich Wolfgang Korngold in Nederland 1910–1958. The Hague, Kallipygos Press, 2016. ISBN 978-90-8243-640-2
