= Deception (1946 film) =

1946 American film directed by Irving Rapper

- Theatrical release poster
- Directed by: Irving Rapper
- Screenplay by: John Collier; Joseph Than
- Based on: Monsieur Lamberthier; 1927 play by Louis Verneuil
- Produced by: Henry Blanke
- Starring: Bette Davis; Paul Henreid; Claude Rains
- Cinematography: Ernest Haller
- Edited by: Alan Crosland Jr.
- Music by: Erich Wolfgang Korngold
- Distributed by: Warner Bros. Pictures
- Release date: October 18, 1946 (United States)
- Running time: 112 minutes
- Country: United States
- Language: English
- Budget: $2.8 million
- Box office: $3.26 million (worldwide)

Deception is a 1946 American film noir drama released by Warner Bros. Pictures and directed by Irving Rapper. The film is based on the 1927 play Monsieur Lamberthier by Louis Verneuil. The screenplay was written by John Collier and Joseph Than. It stars Bette Davis, Paul Henreid, and Claude Rains, who had also appeared together in the highly successful Now, Voyager (1942), which was also directed by Rapper.

== Plot ==
Christine Radcliffe runs in the rain up the stairs of a large symphony hall in which a concert is already underway with a performance of Haydn's cello concerto in D. Her eyes fill with tears as she recognizes the cellist on stage: Karel Novak who spent the war trapped in neutral Sweden. After his performance, Novak is mobbed by well-wishers. He then returns to his dressing room as the concert is heard resuming after intermission with Schubert's unfinished symphony. Christine enters and their eyes meet in his mirror. The couple embrace while Christine cries, "I thought you were dead. I saw them kill you."

Karel and Christine return to her apartment. She has told him that she is living a financially precarious life as a pianist but this conflicts with what Karel sees in her apartment, such as a fur coat hanging in the closet and rare art on display. He makes assumptions and confronts her, but frightens himself with his own vehemence and apologizes, though says he is leaving. She stops him with the confession she lowered herself to taking "rich, untalented pupils" who gifted her with the items.

They marry, but the composer Alexander Hollenius makes a dramatic entrance at their wedding reception. It is evident he is jealous, and the stress leads him to squeeze a wine glass he is holding until it shatters. Hollenius soon gives Novak a manuscript score of his new cello concerto, which Novak agrees to perform at its premiere. It becomes apparent to Christine that a cellist in the orchestra, Bertram Gribble, is being tutored in the solo part by Hollenius. Suspecting the sabotage of her husband's career, she unsuccessfully attempts to bribe Gribble into not co-operating.

Friction develops between Novak and Hollenius, and the composer angrily breaks off a dress rehearsal on the grounds of Novak's temperamental behavior. He does, however, make it clear that he intends to have Novak play the concerto. On the evening of the premiere, Christine visits Hollenius, who threatens to allow Novak the joy of a successful performance only to destroy him by telling him about their love affair. Distraught, Christine shoots him dead.

Another conductor, Neilsen, takes the place of the absent Hollenius, and the performance is a great success. While well-wishers wait, Christine confesses everything to her husband, and they leave the concert hall together. As they walk out a lady says, "Oh, Christine, you must be the happiest woman in the world," which eventually elicits a wan smile from Christine.

== Cast ==
- Bette Davis as Christine Radcliffe
- Paul Henreid as Karel Novak
- Claude Rains as Alexander Hollenius
- John Abbott as Bertram Gribble
- Benson Fong as Jimmy, Hollenius' manservant
- Richard Erdman as Jerry Spencer, music student (uncredited)
- Einar Nilson as Nilson, orchestra conductor (uncredited)

== Production ==
The film was based on a play Monsieur Lamberthier by Louis Verneuil, which was first performed in Paris in 1927. It opened on Broadway as Jealousy on October 22, 1928, at Maxine Elliott's Theatre, as a two-hander (a play with only two main characters), with Fay Bainter and John Halliday. It was turned into a film, also titled Jealousy (1929), with Jeanne Eagels and Fredric March, and directed by Jean de Limur. The play was presented again on Broadway on October 1, 1946, under the title Obsession at the Plymouth Theatre, with Eugenie Leontovich and Basil Rathbone. Warner Bros. originally purchased the play as a vehicle for Barbara Stanwyck and Paul Henreid.

According to TCM, Davis wanted Deception to be a two-character film, like the play. In the play, the character played by Rains is a voice on the phone. The 1929 film is set in Paris, and the characters are the owner of a dress shop, the young artist she marries, and the elderly boulevardier who bought the dress shop for her. The young man confesses, and the play ends with the expectation that he will get off easily. Glenn Erickson observes: “ In the original play the Karel Novak character is the one moved to violence at the conclusion, so Deception may be a case of a play distorted by the needs of the Hollywood Star Vehicle. Also gumming up the works is the Production Code, which wasn't about to accept a woman finding happiness after admitting to years of unmarried sex.”

The working title of the film was “Her Conscience,” but Davis objected. The title “Jealousy” was not available.

Paul Henreid says he enjoyed working with Bette Davis again but did not get along with Irving Rapper, the two men barely speaking to each other.

Shura Cherkassky recorded Ludwig van Beethoven's Appassionata Sonata for Davis' onscreen performance. A lifelong pianist, Davis rehearsed the piece three hours a day with the goal of playing it live on camera. Director Irving Rapper asked, "Why bother?", knowing that viewers would not believe it was her performance. She achieved perfect synchronization with Cherkassky's recording.

Henreid's cello playing was dubbed by Eleanor Aller, who was pregnant with her son Frederick Zlotkin, who became a noted cellist. Her father, Gregory Aller, coached Henreid in plausible bow movements. For some scenes, Henreid’s arms were tied behind him, and two cellists put their arms through the sleeves of a specially designed coat.

Hollenius' Cello Concerto was composed by Erich Wolfgang Korngold. When the score is glimpsed onscreen, Hollenius' signature is in Korngold's hand. Korngold subsequently expanded this material and published it as his own cello concerto. In the film, when Karel Novak is asked which composers he likes best, he replies, "Stravinsky when I think of the present, Richard Strauss when I think of the past, and of course, Hollenius, who combines the rhythm of today with the melody of yesterday." The description of Hollenius could also be applied to Korngold.

Bette Davis found out that she was pregnant during filming.

== Reception ==
=== Critical response ===
Despite the earlier success of Davis, Henreid, Rains and director Rapper, and generally positive reviews, Deception proved to be an expensive exercise for its producers. With high production costs and modest cinema patronage, it became the first Bette Davis film to lose money for Warner Bros.

Film critic Dennis Schwartz generally liked the film, writing, "Irving Rapper (Shining Victory/Now, Voyager/Rhapsody in Blue) helms this labored romantic melodrama, a remake of the early talkie 1929 Jealousy that was also based on a Louis Verneuil play. It's written by John Collier and Joseph Than ... With classical music filling the background, cheesy soap opera dialogue in the forefront, histrionics taking over the concert hall, none of the characters being likable and Bette Davis as hammy as ever, this preposterous opera-like tale is amazingly enjoyable as straight theatrical drama that is nevertheless campy and could easily have been treated as comedy."

Glenn Erickson notes that “The real fun is watching Claude Rains sink his teeth into a worthy role... Rains is always great when playing intense, articulate men imposing their will on others and his Hollenius is quite a creation. The haughty composer pauses more than once to tell Christine outright where she's going wrong, explaining to her how she makes it easy for him to control her. Rains' character is by far the most interesting, so it's no surprise that fans credit him with running away with the picture.”

=== Box office ===
According to Warner Bros. records, the film earned $2,132,000 domestically and $1,130,000 in foreign markets.

== Accolades ==
The film is recognized by American Film Institute in these lists:

- 2005: AFI's 100 Years of Film Scores – Nominated

== Home media ==
On April 1, 2008, Warner Home Video released the film as part of the box set The Bette Davis Collection, Volume 3 before it was released as an individual DVD on July 12, 2015. The upcoming reissue will be released through Warner Archive Collection.

Has been shown on the Turner Classic Movies show 'Noir Alley' with Eddie Muller.

== Works cited ==
- Martin, Mick and Porter, Marsha DVD & Video Guide 2006
