= Passover Psalm =

1941 choral-orchestral work

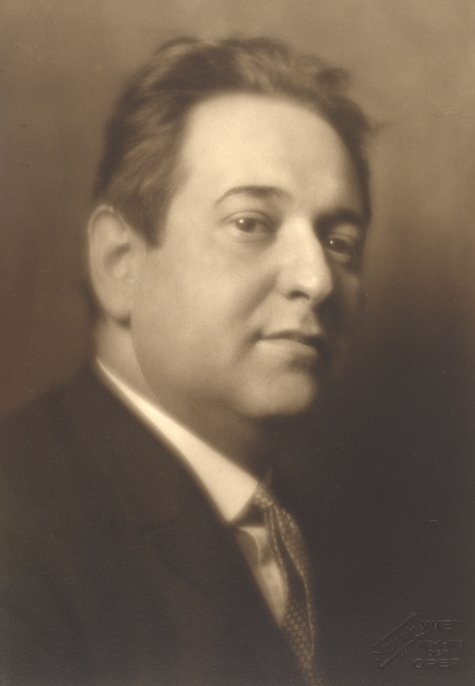
The composer Korngold in 1927

Passover Psalm is a choral-orchestral work for soprano, mixed chorus (SATB), orchestra and organ by composer Erich Wolfgang Korngold. It was composed in 1941 from a commission of Jacob Sonderling, who led the Society for Jewish Culture in Los Angeles. Passover Psalm and Prayer were Korngold's only non-secular compositions.

Sonderling wrote the Haggadah texts that Korngold adapted, intended for Passover. Passover Psalm was one of five pieces commissioned by Sonderling from émigré composers fleeing The Holocaust.

Korngold conducted the first performance of the work on 12 April 1941. In 2003, Swiss conductor Marcello Viotti conducted a live version of this piece with the Munich Radio Orchestra and with soloist voice Emily Magee, that was included successively in some anthology albums, mostly of religious music and Korngold compilations.

== The work ==
The structure and musicality of the work resembles Korngold's previous orchestral works that were in a line between the melancholic, the religious and the cinematic, and that will influence Korngold himself to do more in his successive works, especially the ones based on the soundtracks of the movies he composed. (One notable example is the choral work Tomorrow, that he will compose the year after this composition, and that he will base on his soundtrack for the movie The Constant Nymph.) The composition, solemn and with clear influence from Mahler, Brahms and Bruckner, calls also for a piano and an organ during the gargantuan finale minutes, that close the whole in a bang, with the hope of peace, love and harmony, especially in a period full of desperation, hope and confusion associated with World War II.

== Lyrics ==
The work's lyrics were arranged by Jacob Sonderling. The piece begins:

Let us praise, let us honour,
Let us sing praise to him,
to him, who did wonders
for our fathers and us, their children.
