= Sinfonietta (Korngold) =

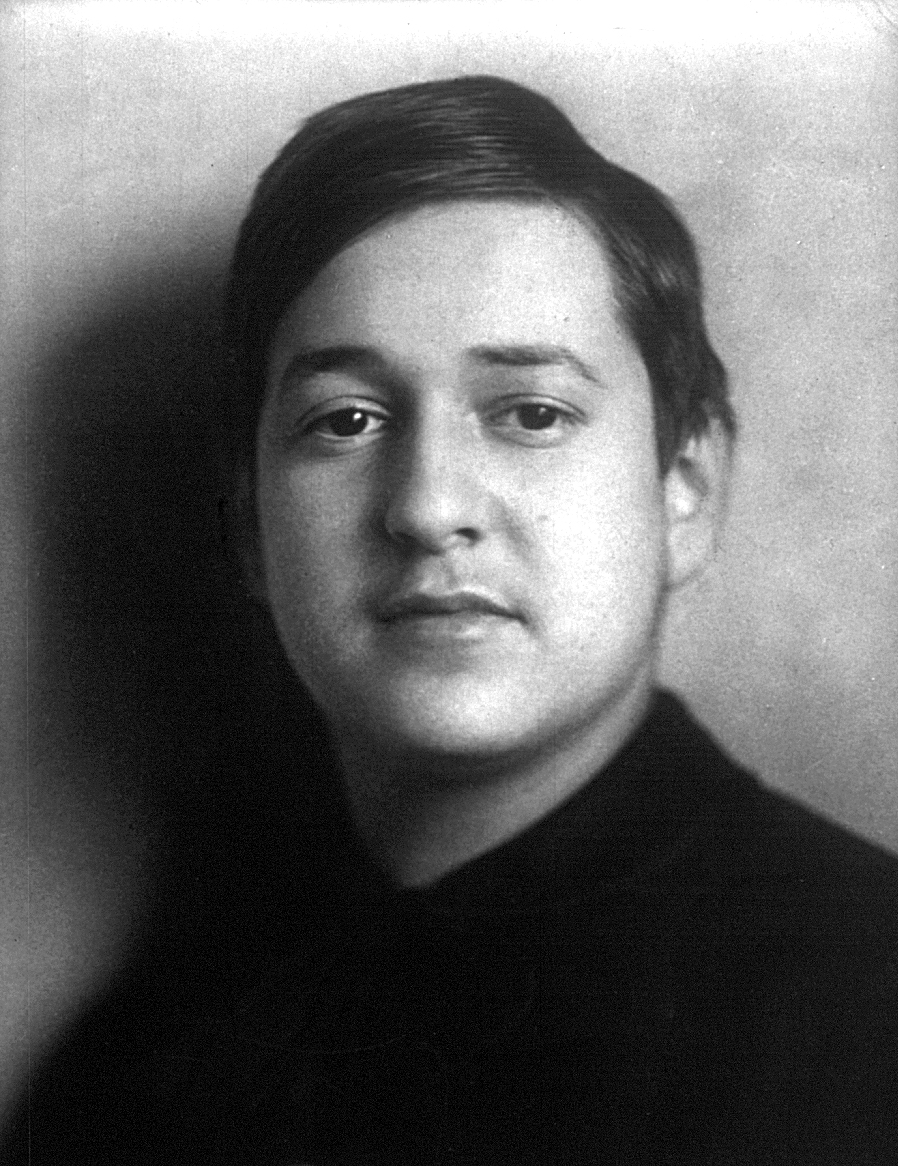
Erich Wolfgang Korngold (undated, c. 1912)

The Sinfonietta in B major, Op. 5, is the first large-scale orchestral work written by the 20th-century Austrian composer Erich Wolfgang Korngold.

== Composition and performance ==
Korngold began sketching the work in the spring of 1912 (about a year after his childhood mentor, Gustav Mahler, died), just before his 15th birthday and finished the sketches in August 1912. The orchestration of it dragged on for another year, until September 1913, by which time Korngold had composed his Violin Sonata, Op. 6, and had begun his first opera Der Ring des Polykrates, Op. 7. The Sinfonietta was premiered in Vienna on 30 November 1913 under the direction of Felix Weingartner (to whom the work is dedicated, in thanks for his support of Korngold), and was a sensational success, resulting in further performances all over Europe and America.

== Structure ==
The work is in four movements:

1. Fließend, mit heiterem Schwunge (Flowing, with cheerful motion)
2. Scherzo: Molto agitato, rasch und feurig (Quickly and fiery)
3. Molto andante (Träumerisch) (Dreamy)
4. Finale: Patetico - Allegro giocoso

== Instrumentation ==
The work is scored for 2 flutes, piccolo (also third flute), 2 oboes (the second also cor anglais), 2 clarinets, bass clarinet in B♭, 2 bassoons, contrabassoon, 4 horns in F, 3 trumpets in C, 3 trombones, tuba, timpani, glockenspiel, triangle, snare drum, cymbals, bells in F♯ and B, 2 harps, celesta, upright piano and strings.

== Bibliography ==
- Duchen, Jessica (1996), Erich Wolfgang Korngold, London: Phaidon Press, ISBN 0-7148-3155-7
