= Juarez (film) =

1939 film by William Dieterle

- Theatrical release poster
- Directed by: William Dieterle
- Screenplay by: Aeneas MacKenzie; John Huston; Wolfgang Reinhardt
- Based on: The Phantom Crown 1934 novel by Bertita Harding; Juarez and Maximilian 1925 play by Franz Werfel
- Produced by: Hal B. Wallis
- Starring: Paul Muni; Bette Davis; Brian Aherne; Claude Rains; John Garfield; Donald Crisp; Joseph Calleia; Gale Sondergaard; Gilbert Roland; Henry O'Neill
- Cinematography: Tony Gaudio
- Edited by: Warren Low
- Music by: Erich Wolfgang Korngold
- Production company: Warner Bros. Pictures
- Distributed by: Warner Bros. Pictures
- Release date: April 24, 1939
- Running time: 125 minutes
- Country: United States
- Language: English

Juarez is a 1939 American historical drama film directed by William Dieterle. The screenplay by Aeneas MacKenzie, John Huston, and Wolfgang Reinhardt is based on the 1934 biography The Phantom Crown by Bertita Harding and the 1925 play Juarez and Maximilian by Franz Werfel.

== Plot ==
The film focuses on the ongoing conflict between Maximilian I, an Austrian archduke who is installed as the ruler of Mexico by the French Napoleon III, and Benito Juárez, the country's U.S.-backed president. In 1863, Napoleon III of France, fearful he will lose Mexico to Juárez, circumvents the Monroe Doctrine by instituting sovereign rule and controlling an election that places Maximilian von Habsburg on the Mexican throne.

Upon his arrival in the country with his wife Carlota of Belgium, Maxmilian realizes he is expected to establish French supremacy by confiscating land that Juárez had returned to the native people and penalizing the rebels under his command. Maximilian decides to abdicate his throne but is deterred from doing so by Carlota.

Maximillian offers Juárez the position of prime minister, but Juárez's refusal to compromise democratic self-rule for the Mexican people creates an unbridgeable rift between the two. When the American Civil War comes to an end, the United States warns Napoleon that it intends to enforce the Monroe Doctrine by military force if necessary, sending arms in support of Juárez's army. Their efforts are thwarted by Vice President Alejandro Uradi, who seizes the American ammunition and therefore virtually guarantees victory for Maximilian. However, Napoleon orders all French troops to evacuate Mexico, leaving Maximilian without an army.

Angered by this move, Carlota returns to Paris to appeal to Napoleon, but she suffers a mental breakdown. Juárez and his rebels capture Maxmillian and his men. Although arrangements to set him free are made, he insists on remaining with his supporters. Tried and found guilty, they are sentenced to death by firing squad.

== Cast ==
- Paul Muni as Benito Juárez
- Bette Davis as Carlota of Belgium, Empress of Mexico
- Brian Aherne as Maximilian I of Mexico
- John Garfield as Porfirio Diaz
- Claude Rains as Napoléon III
- Donald Crisp as General Marechal Achille Bazaine
- Joseph Calleia as Alejandro Uradi
- Gale Sondergaard as Empress Eugénie
- Gilbert Roland as Colonel Miguel Lopez
- Henry O'Neill as General Miguel Miramon
- William Wilkerson as General Tomas Mejia
- Harry Davenport as Dr. Samuel Basch
- Louis Calhern as Le Marc
- Walter Kingsford as Prince von Metternich
- Irving Pichel as Gen. Carbajal
- Montagu Love as Jose de Montares
- John Miljan as Mariano Escobedo
- Hugh Sothern as John Bigelow
- Mickey Kuhn as Agustín de Iturbide y Green
- Holmes Herbert as Marshal Randon (uncredited)
- Frank Reicher as Charles, duc de Morny (uncredited)

== Production ==
As early as 1935, producer Hal B. Wallis had proposed a film about Maximilian I of Mexico and Benito Juárez to director Max Reinhardt. At the time, he was interested in casting Luther Adler as the titular Mexican president. In 1937, Wallis and Jack L. Warner, in an effort to dissuade any other studios from embarking upon a similar project, purchased the screen rights to both the novel The Phantom Crown by Bertita Harding and the play Juarez and Maximilian by Franz Werfel, and on September 30, Aeneas MacKenzie began writing a first draft under associate producer Henry Blanke's supervision. According to Blanke, "Our problem from the outset in preparing this story for the screen was by no means one of glossing over facts, but rather one of cleaving to the exact line." To ensure the film was as accurate as possible, Warner Bros. head of research Herman Lissauer acquired three hundred books on the subject, and two historians were hired to help with changes to the script. Because Wallis had decided to cast Paul Muni, then one of the studio's most prestigious contract players, as Juárez, MacKenzie was instructed to make the role the most dominant in the film. His initial script was long enough for two films, and John Huston and Wolfgang Reinhardt were called in to help trim it. Abem Finkel, who had contributed to the screenplays for Marked Woman and Jezebel, worked on the dialogue but received no screen credit for his efforts.

In August 1938, Wallis, Blanke, director William Dieterle and Muni traveled to Mexico, stopping in 15 small towns, then visited the National Museum in Mexico City, where Juárez's personal papers were housed. They also managed to find a 116-year-old man who had fought with Juárez and Porfirio Diaz, and Muni questioned him about the president's mannerisms and speech patterns at length. He worked with makeup artist Perc Westmore to transform his face to resemble Juárez by changing his bone structure and skin tone, a process that took three hours each day. Despite the fact the actor closely resembled his character, studio head Jack L. Warner was unhappy with the results and complained "You mean we're paying Muni all this dough and we can't even recognize him?" However the premiere audience in Mexico City audibly gasped at first sight of Muni as Juárez, the resemblance being so remarkable.

On October 12, 1938, Bette Davis was offered the role of Carlota of Belgium while in the midst of filming Dark Victory. Although the part was small, she welcomed the opportunity to portray an historical figure, especially one who would go mad during a dramatic confrontation with Napoléon III. She was asked to submit to makeup tests by Perc Westmore and costume fittings by Orry-Kelly but refused to do so while still working on another character. She reported to the set on December 13, two weeks after principal photography had begun and one week after her divorce from husband Harmon Nelson had been granted, but announced she was unprepared to film her first scene and went home. Filming was suspended for several days, and when Davis returned to the studio she was fretful and distracted. By Christmas, she was close to a nervous breakdown. Soon after the holiday, she was diagnosed with a severe case of pleurisy, and as a result she frequently remained in bed until 3:00 pm, finally reporting to work in the late afternoon with a high temperature. Filming of the scene in which Carlota confronts Napoléon III (Claude Rains) was postponed for two days until she felt well enough to attempt it.

John Garfield was cast as Porfirio Diaz at the request of Paul Muni, who appeared with Garfield in the 1932 Broadway play Counsellor at Law. Garfield was relatively unknown in Hollywood at the time, but by the time filming began he had received critical acclaim for his performance in Four Daughters. Studio executives questioned his playing a relatively minor role in Juarez, but the actor was anxious to appear in it, so he remained in the cast, his box-office appeal managing to win out over his heavy Bronx accent. Garfield's reviews were uniformly bad, and Diaz proved to be the only period role he played in his career.

The epic film boasted 1,186 supporting players performing on 54 sets designed by art director Anton Grot and his assistant Leo Kuter. The largest was an 11-acre replica of Mexico constructed on a ranch in Calabasas, California. Behind the throne room and living quarters of Maximilian (Brian Aherne) was a 250-foot-long and 50-foot-high backdrop of Mexico City, with Popocatépetl in the distance.

Erich Wolfgang Korngold researched the music popular in Mexico during the period and discovered it was "unmistakenly Viennese." He composed 3,000 bars of music for the score, at times emulating the rhythms of Frédéric Chopin and Franz Schubert, and the second theme of the first movement of his Violin Concerto was drawn from his work for the film.

Audience reaction to the first preview was so negative the film was recut, with entire scenes transposed. A new ending designed to soften Muni's portrayal of Juárez was filmed, although the scene - in which Juárez visits the cathedral where Maximilian is lying in state and asks for his forgiveness - has no basis in fact.

The film opened in New York City on April 24, 1939, and went into general release on June 4.

== Critical reception ==
Upon its initial release, Frank S. Nugent of The New York Times observed "Ideologically the new Warner film is faultless. What it has to say about the conflict between imperialist, benevolent despot and democrat has been expressed logically and eloquently, with reasonable fidelity to historic fact...But approval of a film's purpose and message cannot blind one altogether to some of the weaknesses of its structure. Juarez has not been smoothly assembled. Its central character has been thrown out of focus by a lesser one. Too much and too little attention has been paid to the subordinate people in the drama. William Dieterle, who ordinarily directs so well, has been guilty in this instance of a surprisingly static camera, of stage technique rather than cinematic. The picture runs for something more than two hours, which should have been enough to balance its budget and its plot. Yet it is out of balance, in character and in narrative. Possibly the fault is in its editing, although that would not explain it all." He continued, "The picture seems one long dissolve from council chamber to council chamber, broken rather pointlessly by a pompous ceremony of royal adoption...and dramatically by Carlota's mad scene and Juarez's bold outfacing of a traitor. In the last mentioned two, the picture enters brilliantly into the true medium of cinema expression, blends imagery with eloquence and vitalizes its screen. But the very vividness of these sequences accentuates the staticism of many of the others — a pictorial staticism, we hasten to add, for the quality of the writing is splendid, the measure of the performance high, the concept admirable." He concluded "Juarez, with all its faults, still must be rated a distinguished, memorable and socially valuable film."

In later years, Time Out London stated "Only Bette Davis and Gale Sondergaard have any fire in this otherwise plodding Warner Bros costume drama," while Channel 4 noted "Despite the frills, there is very little substance in this overcooked adventure."

== Awards and nominations ==
Brian Aherne was nominated for the Academy Award for Best Supporting Actor at the 12th Academy Awards. Juarez was on a preliminary list of submissions from the studios for an Academy Award for Best Cinematography (Black-and-White) but was not nominated.

== See also ==
- The Mad Empress - 1939 film distributed by Warner Bros.
