= United Kingdom patent 394325 =

Seminal work on stereophonic sound by Alan Blumlein

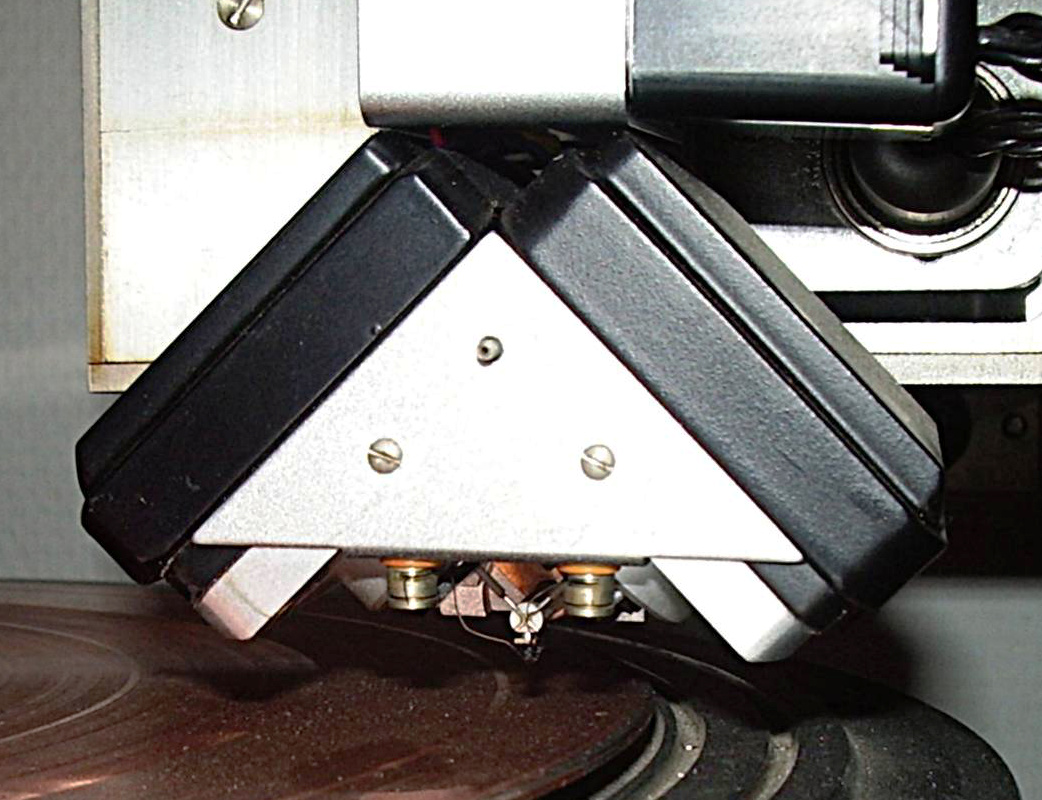
Professional recorder for cutting stereo master disks. Actuators for two stereo channels are placed at +45° and −45° to the vertical axis. The 45/45 recording system was proposed by Blumlein in patent 394325, tested in December 1933 and January 1934, and became a worldwide standard in the 1950s

The United Kingdom patent 394325 'Improvements in and relating to Sound-transmission, Sound-recording and Sound-reproducing Systems' is a fundamental work on stereophonic sound, written by Alan Blumlein in 1931 and published in 1933. The work exists only in the form of a patent and two accompanying memos addressed to Isaac Shoenberg. The text is exceptionally long for a patent of the period, having 70 numbered claims. It contains a brief summary of sound localization theory, a roadmap for introduction of surround sound in sound film and recording industry, and a description of Blumlein's inventions related to stereophony, notably the matrix processing of stereo signals, the Blumlein stereo microphone and the 45/45 mechanical recording system.

In 1933–1935 Blumlein built experimental stereo recording equipment and recorded two sets of stereo recordings using mechanical and optical media. Commercial implementation of his invention became a reality in the late 1950s, when the patent had expired. Blumlein's 45/45 system became a worldwide standard for stereo LP records, and Blumlein himself was proclaimed "the inventor of stereo".

== Background ==
Experimental binaural (stereophonic) sets by Ader, Keller and Blumlein. The Keller set is shown in its minimal, three-channel configuration

In 1881 Clément Ader presented the Théâtrophone – a working system for live delivery of opera performances over telephone lines. The théâtrophone was a one-to-one network, employing one carbon microphone to energize one remote telephone receiver, and required rows of microphones placed along the stage. While experimenting with parallel lines, Ader accidentally discovered stereo effect. By placing pairs of microphones at either side of the stage, near the footlights, Ader achieved strong binaural sound localization, simulating the effect of sitting at the edge of the stage, hearing actors and instruments as if they were spread in front of the listener. Ader himself explained the effect as the result of the differences in apparent loudness registered by the ears of the listener. Binaural théâtrophone, advertized as "auro-stereroscopic" or "binaural audition" failed to attract customers due to the need to have two telephone lines per subscriber, and overall low fidelity. Conventional, monaural théâtrophone operated successfully in France, Hungary, Italy and the United Kingdom until the end of the 1920s.

In the 1900s Lord Rayleigh formulated the scientific sound localization theory. In Rayleigh's model, human hearing localizes low-frequency sounds based on phase difference between the signals registered by left and right ears (interaural time difference, ITD); high-frequency sounds are localized based on relative loudness of two signals (interaural level difference, ILD). Rayleigh's duplex (two-factor) model remains valid in the 21st century, with the addition of a third mechanism, the analysis of spectral cues provided by mechanical filtering of incoming soundwaves by human torso, head and pinna.

During World War I acoustic location was actively researched for military applications of air defense, artillery sound ranging and naval hydroacoustics. Valve amplifiers that emerged at about the same time allowed reproduction of sound via loudspeakers. Early experiments with amplified reproduction of binaural signals ended in failure: binaural effect that was easily reproduced via stereo headphones was either weakened or completely absent.

In the end of the 1920s researchers of American and British corporations approached the amplified stereo problem; basic strategy for solving it had taken shape in the early 1930s. Stereophony could not bring immediate financial gains: the main potential customer, cinema, was content with crude monaural sound film equipment; the Great Depression ruled out investments in new sound systems. However, the corporations were eagerly accumulating patent portfolios in anticipation of economic recovery, and continued financing research. Arthur C. Keller and Harvey Fletcher of Bell Labs and Alan Blumlein of Columbia Graphophone Company and EMI were the first to obtain practical results. Each of the three inventors had a different objective, and followed a different course of research.

Fletcher followed Bell Labs strategy for the improvement of traditional telephony. He concentrated on transmission of sound field images of the original for binaural reproduction via headphones. His experimental equipment successfully recreated high-quality spatial sonic imagery, but like all binaural systems did not work well with loudspeakers.

Keller was primarily interested in amplified public address sound; he placed arrays of microphones on the stage and transmitted parallel audio signals to arrays of amplified loudspeakers in a remote listening hall, trying to capture and recreate the original "sound front". Best results were obtained with expensive two-dimensional arrays, capable of recreating both width and depth of the original; linear (one-dimensional) arrays could produce almost perfect sense of width, but not depth. The minimal working configuration required three channels (left, centre and right). It was adequate for recreating width, and even a limited sense of depth, but only for the listeners sitting close to the axis of the centre channel, and too expensive for the consumer market. A cheaper two-channel stereo setup could not reproduce the sound field; the sound inevitably broke up into left and right point sources with a "hole in the middle".

Blumlein envisaged introduction of surround sound in the film industry. He rejected the binaural model from the start. Instead of recreating spatial sound fields or "sound front" radiated by the orchestra, he settled on recreating the sound that is heard by a listener sitting in a concert hall, or by a camera operator on a film set. He reasoned that the microphone array should mimic human hearing apparatus, thus the two microphones must be placed close together (and close to the film camera). The resulting binaural signals cannot be used directly in an amplified stereo setup. However, wrote Blumlein, a two-channel recording with carefully altered phase and level differences can deceive the listener with a lifelike spatial illusion.

== Publication ==
External images
- First official publication of the patent, 1933
- Handwritten memo, July 4, 1932
- Typewritten memo, July 21, 1932
- American publication of the patent, 1958 (incomplete)

Very little is known about Blumlein's work on stereo prior to filing the patent application. According to biographer Robert Alexander, theoretical studies probably commenced not earlier than March 1931. Blumlein did not keep work journals, and did not publish journal articles; the first written evidence of his studies, a work paper explaining the shuffling technique, is dated 25 September 1931. Practical experiments in 1931 were impossible due to the merger of Columbia and the Gramophone Company into EMI, subsequent restructuring and relocation of Blumlein's laboratory to the new building in Hayes.

On 14 December 1931 Blumlein filed patent application at The Patent Office. The final revision of the application was filed 10 November 1932 and was granted patent status 14 June 1933 with priority right since 10 November 1932. The first, official publication was 24 pages long (22 text pages and 11 illustrations on two pages). The text contained an extraordinary 70 (or "more than 70") claims (a typical patent of the period contained six).

On 4 July 1932 Blumlein compiled an eighteen-page long handwritten summary of the patent, probably intended for Isaac Shoenberg. The second, much shorter memo contains eight typewritten pages. It was signed by Blumlein on 21 July 1932 and duly received and read by Shoenberg. Both memos are now preserved at the British Library.

Neither the patent, nor the memos ever mention the word stereo or its derivatives: Blumlein used the term binaural. There are no references to preceding works, apart from the unnamed military hydroacoustics researchers. In the 1950s and the 1980s American critics hypothesized that Blumlein, who worked in the London branch of Western Electric in the 1920s, could have been familiar with concurrent work by Keller and Fletcher, however, no substantive evidence was ever found. The only certain connection is the fact that Blumlein used Western Electric microphones and disk recorders, which were already retired from EMI studios. According to Barry Fox, the issue of priority has no answer. The origins of the ideas and the paths of thought remain unknown; the technical implementations of these ideas were too different to suspect any exchange. There was no commercial incentive to beat the competition in developing a marketable product; the inventors were working, literally, for the next generation.

== Ideas and inventions ==
=== Psychoacoustics of sound localization ===
Blumlein was a modest man who never sought publicity; according to Alexander, "quite often [he was] not fully aware of his genius" or the value of many of his inventions. This wasn't the case with patent 394325: Blumlein "certainly had some feeling for the enormity of this work", and thus prefaced the patent formula with a summary on psychoacoustics of sound localization. Blumlein's theory follows Rayleigh's duplex model, with minor amendments:

- At low frequencies or long wavelengths localization is determined by the difference in phase. The head is too small to register any differences in sound pressure levels, leaving phase as the only directional clue;
- At high frequencies or short wavelengths phase ceases to be a reliable clue. However, now the head forms a relatively large baffle, physically separate left and right signals. Thus the brain can rely on relative differences in sound intensity;
- Fast percussive high-frequency sounds are localized based on the time differences between arriving attack transients, in a manner similar to low-frequency phase differences.

Rayleigh drew the line between low and high frequencies at 1.5–3 kHz. Blumlein noted that the "line" is actually several octaves wide, starting at around 700 Hz. Within this band, human hearing can register and evaluate phase and level differences simultaneously. Phase mechanism alone works only below 700 Hz. It is the low-frequency phase information that is lost when binaural signals are reproduced via loudspeakers.

Blumlein tracked the cause of this loss to omnidirectional pressure microphones which were the principal type used in studio recording. Blumlein proved mathematically that phase differences registered by pressure microphones and clearly heard via headphones will be inevitably lost when reproduced via loudspeakers. He suggested compensating losses of phase with pre-emphasizing low-frequency level differences between two stereo channels. When spatial clues present in source signals indicate that the virtual sound source must be positioned to the left of the listener, playback equipment must increase the gain in left channel and attenuate the right channel, and vice versa. These manipulations had to be limited lo low-frequency content; Blumlein specifically warned against tampering with treble signals. The known anomalies of high-frequency hearing were not properly researched and understood yet, so the inventor confined his research to already well-understood low frequencies.

=== Matrix processing of stereo signals ===
Popular perception of stereo that emerged decades after the death of Blumlein usually treats stereo signal as the aggregate of two independent channels, left (L) and right (R). Blumlein proposed an alternative approach: stereo consists of a monaural signal M, which is common to both left and right louspeaker channels, and a differential side signal S that defines spatial distribution of sound. The M and S signals are easily derived from L and R by addition and subtraction:

M = 0.7017 (L + R)
S = 0.7017 (L – R),

and can be converted back to L and R just as easily:

L = 0.7017 (M + S)
R = 0.7017 (M – S).

Blumlein shuffling: conversion of phase differences to level differences

Left and right binaural signals. R lags behind L, thus the image is localized to the left

Corresponding M and S signals are exactly 90° apart

After shifting S by 90°, the new side signal S" is either in phase with M (for images localized to the left) or has the opposite polarity (for images localized to the right)

Addition and subtraction forms new channels L"=M+S" and R"=M-S", which have exactly same phase but different levels. L" is higher than R", thus the image is localized to the left

The electronic adder-subtractor performing these conversion is called MS matrix or MS array. Blumlein's original, bidirectional passive array used two wideband transformers; in the semiconductor age MS arrays are usually unidirectional, built around operational amplifiers and precision resistors. The scaling coefficients of 0.7017 (square root of 0.5) in the above formulae assure equality of input and output power: L^{2}+R^{2} = M^{2}+S^{2}. In practice the coefficients and polarities may be chosen at will.

The simplest use of matrix processing devised by Blumlein in patent 394325 is the stereo width control. Attenuation of S while keeping M constant decreases stereo width; attenuation of S to zero eliminates any spatial cues. Amplification of S increases stereo width. Increasing low-frequency components of S (below 700 Hz) by a factor of 1.6–2.5 produces a particularly strong sense of spaciousness. Finally, inversion of side channel polarity flips left and right signals, producing a mirror image of the original sound field.

=== Blumlein shuffling ===
When an off-center, low-frequency sound source is registered with binaural pressure microphones, the resulting L and R signals have the same intensities and differ only in phase. As a result, the corresponding side signal S is shifted exactly +90° or −90° relative to M. (positive or negative sign of the shift indicates left or right localization of sound source). Simple stereo width manipulation described above can increase phase difference between the widened L' and R' signals, but cannot alter distribution of energy. The intensity of L' remains equal to the intensity of R'.

However, as Blumlein explained in patent 394325, matrix processing of phase enables channeling energy from L to R or vice versa. This requires shifting side signal S by +90° or −90°. The new, shifted signal S" is now in phase with the original M (for signals localized to the left) or out of phase with it (for signals localized to the right). Addition of M and S" and subtraction of S" from M creates new left and right signals L" and R", having different intensities and zero or 180° phase shift. Energy is channeled into the L" or R", depending on the localization of the original sound source. This operation – conversion of interchannel timing differences into interchannel level differences – became known as the Blumlein shuffling, and the required MS array is called the Blumlein shuffler. Patent 394325 provides only a cursory description of the shuffler; it was described at length in the application for patent 429022, filed in October 1933.

=== Stereo microphones ===
Three configurations devised by Blumlein. The MS and XY are shown exactly as in patent 394325; the splayed XY is shown in its later, most used implementation with cardioid microphones

Shuffling technique was invented specifically for pressure microphones, which are unable to register level differences between two stereo channels. Ribbon microphones (velocity microphones in Blumlein's patent) with bidirectional (figure 8) polar pattern can register both phase and level differences, and don't need shuffling.

Blumlein proposed three alternative configurations for stereo pairs of ribbon microphones. All three require placement of two ribbon microphones on a common vertical axis, as close together as possible:

- MS: central channel microphone (M) points directly to the center of the soundstage (Blumlein used the word screen, emphasizing use in cinema). Side channel microphone S is placed at right angle to M;
- XY (later the Blumlein pair): left (X) and right (Y) channel microphones are placed at −45° and 45° to the direction the center of the soundstage
- Splayed XY is similar, but the angle between X and Y is set arbitrarily, to fit the conditions at the set and avoid further processing of stereo signals.

Studio-grade ribbon microphones did not exist yet in 1931. Practical stereo microphone technique was tested and patented by Blumlein later, in 1934–1935.

=== 45/45 mechanical recording ===
Double-groove, 0/90 and 45/45 stereo recording systems. Colour of the arrows indicates relative polarity. Feeding the 0/90 cutter head with M (lateral) and S (vertical) signals instead of L and R produces result similar to the 45/45 cutter; this was the arrangement actually tested by Blumlein

Prior to the Blumlein patent, there were two alternative approaches to mechanical stereo recording. The 0/90 system combined two independent soundtracks in a single groove. One track (or stereo channel) was recorded vertically ("0"), another laterally ("90"). In the 1920s John Logie Baird used this approach for recording audio and video signals in his mechanical television. The 0/90 system was a poor choice for stereo sound due to different distortion patterns of lateral and vertical recordings.

The alternative double-groove system employed two cutters for recording parallel grooves, and two pickups for playing them back. On 12 March 1932 Keller used this experimental system to record the Philadelphia Orchestra conducted by Leopold Stokowski – the first ever stereo recording. Double-groove recording did not develop beyond experiments due to the difficulties in placing two pickups on a disc.

Patent 394325 put forward a third proposition: the single cutter should be driven by two orthogonal actuators, placed at 45° and −45° to the surface of the disc. Polarities of electrical L and R signals that drive the actuators must be chosen in such a way that the lateral movement of the cutter corresponds to monaural signal M, and vertical movement corresponds to the difference between two stereo channels, S. This ensures backward compatibility with traditional monaural pick-ups of the most common, lateral-cut system.

Alternatively, the actuators may be placed at 0° and 90° to disc surface, as in the 0/90 system, but driven with M and S electrical signals instead of L and R. The resulting recording is identical to true 45/45 recordings, except for different frequency response and distortion patterns of lateral (M) and vertical (S) recording channels. Blumlein believed that this configuration simplifies construction of the stereo cutter, because only the critical lateral actuator must fully meet fidelity standards, including treble response to at least 10 kHz. Bandwidth of the vertical actuator could have been limited to 3 kHz.

Concurrently with Blumlein, and independent of him, Arthur C. Keller and Irad S. Rafuse of Bell Labs invented their own variant of the single-groove 45/45 system. However, due to the Great Depression, peculiarities of the United States patent law, and no immediate prospects of commercializing the invention, corporate patent attorneys did not see an urgent need to patent it. The company filed a patent application only in June 1936, more than five years after Blumlein. According to Keller, he learnt of Blumlein's work only in the 1950s.

=== New materials for mechanical recording ===
Prior to the introduction of the LP record, master discs for pressing coarsegroove shellac records were cut on thick reusable discs of ozokerite-based wax. Wax was a low-fidelity medium; it inevitably degraded on each playback and in storage. Wax could not be archived for future reissues. After the first and only production run the wax master was erased with a mechanical shaver, and the recorded original was forever lost. The only storable mechanical medium of the interwar period was the shellac record, which had even lower fidelity than the wax master. Shellac was naturally noisy, and even more surface noise was added by the conductive graphite powder applied to the wax master prior to electroplating and making intermediate stamper discs.

Keller and A. G. Russell proposed replacing graphite powder with a thin layer of gold, sputtered onto the master disc in a vacuum chamber. The process created a high quality conductive layer, without added noise. On 1 December 1931 Keller, Stokowski and the Philadelphia Orchestra made the first recording using the new technology. Bandwidth of the first gold-plated masters extended to 9 kHz, and was soon improved to 10 and later 13 kHz, making these masters the first high fidelity medium. Sample pressings from were made on quiet cellulose triacetate, rather than noisy shellac.

In patent 394325 Blumlein also considered cellulose triacetate, but in a different role – as the mastering material. The proposal materialized after World War II, when the industry switched from wax to acetate lacquer master discs. In 1935 Blumlein researched various resin mixes for pressing production records, but none of these was significantly better than shellac. The solution – synthetic vinyl resin compound – already existed and was used for distributing records within American radio networks. It was yet too expensive for mass production. Vinyl pressings in the United States began in 1943, in response to wartime shortages of natural shellac, and were limited to propaganda programs for the troops. Mass pressings for the civilian market began later, in the end of the 1940s.

== Prototypes and tests ==
On 21 July 1932 Blumlein sent a detailed memo explaining the principles of stereophonic sound to his superior and mentor, technical director of EMI Isaac Shoenberg. It is likely that Shoenberg did not understand the value and depth of Blumlein's proposal, but he trusted Blumlein's intuition and approved construction of an experimental setup consisting of a stereo microphone, a shuffler, a mechanical wax cutter and pickup. Likewise, EMI researchers did not grasp Blumlein's ideas; for a while, the inventor was left alone with his plans. Throughout 1932, Blumlein's team was still engaged in the monaural recording project, evaluating potential patent weaknesses in the EMI design and identifying infringements of EMI patents by the competitors. Work on the stereo prototype commenced only in January 1933.

=== Mechanical recording ===
External audio
- Blumlein's mechanical stereo recordings at the British Library

In February 1933 Blumlein completed the shuffler, and in March 1933 he assembled the first stereo recording set. First experiments were a failure: shellac test records and Western Electric pressure microphones were not fit for handling the subtleties of stereo sound. By July 1933 the record cutter was fully functional, although its treble response did not extend beyond 4 kHz. By December Blumlein's team had tested at least three different configuration of a magnetic stereo pickup and achieved acceptable sound quality. On 9 December 1933 Blumlein completed fine-tuning his stereo cutting lathe with 0/90 arrangement of actuators driven with MS signals, and made first test recording using commercial gramophone records as sound sources. The set, according to Blumlein's notes, achieved good channel separation which was a prerequisite for stereo recording.

On 14 December–15, 1933 Blumlein recorded the first set of ten stereo wax masters at the EMI amateur theatre auditorium. Blumlein and three of his associates themselves performed as live sound sources, walking and talking in front of the microphones. Next day Blumlein evaluated the "walking and talking" recordings and reported "definite binaural effect". Shoenberg concurred, and authorized the use of the EMI Recording Studios (Note: The studios will be formally renamed Abbey Road Studios in 1970.) for experimental live recordings. Over the New Year holidays Blumlein and his team moved their equipment to the largest room at Abbey Road, then called Studio No. 1, and later known as Studio No. 2 and The Beatles Studio.

On 11 January–13, 1934 Blumlein recorded piano and chamber music. The recorded binaural effect was present but weak, far weaker than in recordings of speech. On 19 January Blumlein began recording the London Symphony Orchestra conducted by Thomas Beecham. The results, in Blumlein's own words, varied between "not bad" and "marginal". Blumlein's experimental cutting lathe could record the orchestra in stereo, but the available microphones could not capture and preserve true stereophonic image. This problem was partially solved during subsequent tests in the spring of 1934; the solution, now known as the Blumlein pair, was patented in 1935.

=== Optical recording ===
External videos
- Blumlein's films from the Abbey Road Studios archive
- Trains in Hayes. This is a short, 44-second fragment of a 5-minute original . The small white "flags" on the poles are the wind screen of ribbon microphones.
- Walking and Talking. Blumlein, wearing spectacles and a light grey suit, appears at the end of the roll.

In the beginning of 1935 Cecil Oswald Brown has built the first film camera with synchronous stereo sound recording on a single optical soundtrack. Left and right edges of the soundtrack were modulated independently by the left and right audio amplifiers. Total width between the left and right edges varied proportionally to the monaural signal M, thus the system was backward-compatible with standard monaural cinema projector (and, incidentally, with Dolby Stereo projectors introduced in the 1970s). The prototype camera needed tweaks and tuning, and was ready for test shots only in June 1935.

The first surviving film, Trains in Hayes, is a documentary of railroad traffic at Hayes & Harlington railway station, taken from the roof of nearby office building. The film lasts for 5 minutes and 11 seconds, and combines different takes of similar scenes recorded with different microphone placement. Sonically, Trains in Hayes is the most advanced of all Blumlein recordings. Some of its fragments achieve realistic width and depth of stereophonic sound despite obvious distortion caused by overloaded microphones.

After Trains in Hayes, Blumlein shot five more test films indoors, using his staff and himself as "walking and talking" technology demonstrators. On 26 July 1935 Blumlein began shooting Move the Orchestra – a live action comedy short intended to be a marketing vehicle for his technology. The action took place along a six-meter-long pub bar; the camera remained stationary and fixed, while the actors and the eponymous "orchestra" (a gramophone placed behind the backdrop) moved left and right. Both surviving takes were filmed on the same day, 26 July, and edited in August–September 1935.

Blumlein believed that his test recordings and films had proved the feasibility of surround sound in cinema. According to Eric Nind, the EMI management initiated market studies, planning to supply at least a few experimental sound sets to the theatres, but the venture was terminated before any practical results could be obtained. Louis Sterling, co-founder and marketing director of EMI, felt that improvements in cinema sound could be worthwhile only after the introduction of colour. Likewise, gramophone record industry needed new long-play and low-noise technology prior to introduction of stereo. The Great Depression ruled out investments in yet untested technology; the company had already decided to concentrate on a different target – the television. Schonberg, the main proponent of the EMI TV project, cancelled research in stereo sound in the end of 1935. By this time Blumlein was already engaged full-time on the construction of the BBC Television station at Alexandra Palace.

=== Military applications ===
In 1938 Air Defence Experimental Establishment contracted EMI to manufacture the Mark VIII sound locator. Traditional sound locators relied on the operator's hearing; Blumlein suggested augmenting it with a visual display that incorporated principles of binaural recording. The experimental Visual Indicating Equipment (VIE), presented for tests in October 1938, employed two cathode ray tubes for displaying of target bearing and elevation. The VIE was incorporated into the series production Mark IX sound locator, and retrofitted to thousands of older locators, filling the gap until the deployment of gun-laying radars.

Shortly before the outbreak of World War II Blumlein applied the ideas of patent 394325 to long-range anti-aircraft radars. Unlike the VIE, which handled electrical audio signals directly, Blumlein's radar visualization station worked with the envelopes of amplitude-modulated high-frequency signals. Blumlein proved mathematically that his shuffling approach would work with envelopes just like it did with audio waves. Envelope processing technique became the subject of patent 581920, filed in July 1939. The experimental radar installation in Lake Farm Country Park, operating at 66 MHz carrier wave, began trials in the end of 1939.

== Further development and mass production ==
=== LP records ===
According to British law, the patent remained in force for sixteen years, and was due to expire in 1947. EMI applied for extension to compensate for wartime losses, and the patent was prolonged until 13 December 1953. By this time European entertainment industry was developing rapidly; the British recorded music market was governed by the duopoly of EMI and Decca Records. The format war on the emerging long-play record market was almost over. The winning format, advanced by Columbia Records, was standardized in the United States in 1954 and adopted by British industry in 1955. In 1953 EMI began preparations for production of stereophonic records. Project manager Philip Vanderlyn, a former colleague of Blumlein, evaluated the alternatives and made a choice in favour of the 45/45 system.

Cutting stereo masters and pressing stereo vinyl records did not present any technical problems. The real challenge, preservation of spatial information during recording, remained as elusive as it was in the 1930s. Recording engineers and musicians were seeking the solution by trial and error, with the help of a device not available to Blumlein – the two-track stereo tape recorder. In February 1954 RCA made the first successful stereo recording of an orchestral performance (La damnation de Faust conducted by Charles Munch). In April 1954 the EMI Recording Studios began tests of stereo recordings, using Blumlein's XY microphone. In May, Arthur Haddy of Decca Records made the first recording with a three-microphone Decca tree. Decca engineers, who learned of Blumlein's patent only recently, in the 1950s, tried to develop their own system to a patentable form but failed. Every conceivable aspect of stereophonic sound had already been covered in patent 394325.

The developments at Decca forced EMI to speed up their half-hearted effort. The management believed that stereo recording technology was still unreliable, and refrained from rushing stereo records into production. Instead, in 1957 the company released an expensive intermediate format – prerecorded Stereosonic magnetic tapes. The proprietary recording technique was developed by Blumlein's former colleagues Vanderlyn, Clark and Dutton, and relied on the use of XY Blumlein pairs and Blumlein shufflers that introduced crosstalk at frequencies above 700 Hz. Shuffling was intended to equalize high-frequency and low-frequency sound localization, however, it was a poor match to practical studio environment at Abbey Road. The tapes were too expensive for the consumer market and were soon discontinued.

Other European companies were confident that stereo vinyl is ready for production, and sided with Decca. On 28 November 1957 an industry conference arranged by Haddy approved the 45/45 system, making it the de facto European standard. Haddy flew to the United States to recruit more supporters, and found out that the Americans were ready to launch their own stereo format. The American version of the 45/45 system was patented in the United States by Westrex (a spin off Western Electric), independently of the Blumlein patent, and more than two decades after it. On 25 March 1958 the RIAA adopted the Westrex system as the national standard.

Neither Westrex, nor the RIAA ever credited Blumlein. The British were enraged; even the conservative Gramophone chastised the Americans for "failing to discover Europe", as well as prewar work by Fletcher, Keller and Rafuse. Under pressure, the Audio Engineering Society recognized Blumlein's priority. In an unprecedented move, in April 1958 the Journal of the Audio Engineering Society reprinted the full text of patent 394325. The Westrex patent was now void; the 45/45 system became a worldwide free standard. Blumlein's notion of binaural sound was, however, deemed inappropriate for a commercial product. Instead, the industry used stereophonic and stereo as a free universal trademark. Gramophone objected, again, to no avail. The notion of stereo, which was once loosely applied to any manipulations intended to produce spatial effects, changed its meaning and became synonymous with two-channel sound. Initially, stereo pressings was limited to classical repertoire. Popular music, intended for replay via cheap low-fidelity players, was pressed in mono throughout the 1960s, and was sold at lesser prices than "upscale" stereo records.

=== Microphones ===
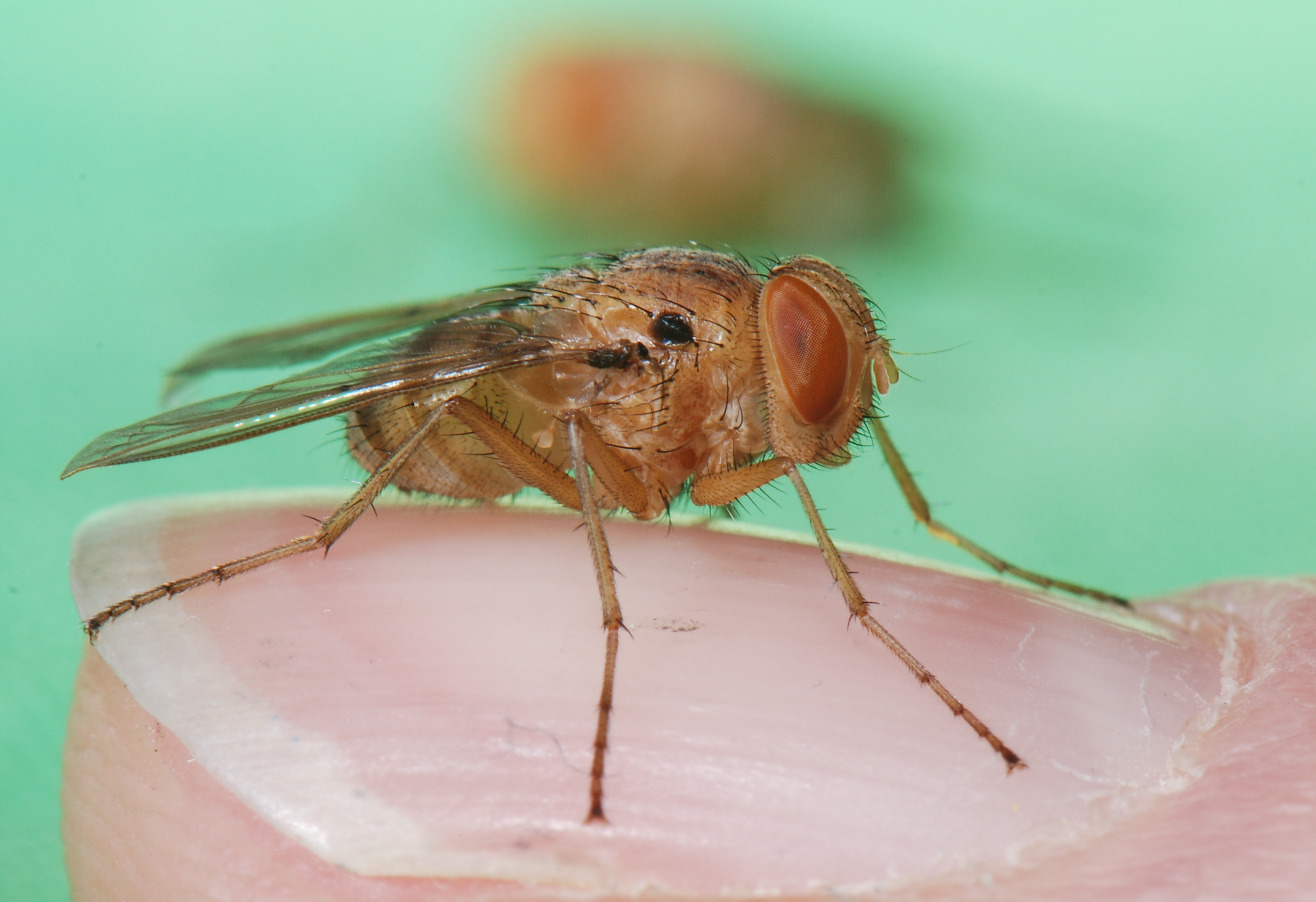
A female Ormia ochracea fly, carrier of a natural Blumlein shuffler

The Blumlein pair, in all three variants discussed in patent 394325, remains in use for recording acoustic music. The most common configuration uses XY arrangement of two bidirectional figure-8 microphones. It is unique for being a constant power instrument: due to the Pythagorean trigonometric identity, any sound source located in the front quadrant will be picked up at uniform combined power, without dips or peaks. In the listening space, two resulting stereo signals will add up acoustically, creating constant-power phantom sound sources. A recording made with an XY pair conveys excellent lateral stereo imaging, filling the entire space between the two loudspeakers. It also excels at picking up reverberations from the back quadrant, which are essential for conveying sense of space and presence. However, proper placement of an XY pair in front of an orchestra can often be difficult or outright impossible. The MS Blumlein pair, using a figure-8 microphone for the S channel and a cardioid microphone for the M channel is similar to the XY pair, but is far less sensitive to rear-quadrant sounds, and is fully compatible with monaural equipment. For these reasons, the MS pair is used primarily in radio, television and cinema. The splayed XY pair is the configuration of choice for using cardioid microphones. In normal, 90-degree XY arrangement such microphones compress the recorded stereo image; increasing the angle to 120...135° effectively restores stereo width.

=== Shufflers ===
Matrix processing of stereo signals is a staple of studio recording technology, but the Blumlein shuffling has seen little use. In the 1980s Richard Kaufman, Michael Gerzon and David Griesinger independently proposed three binaural recording techniques based on the Blumlein shuffling, but their ideas did not gain wide acceptance, either.

In the 1990s researchers found that the Blumlein shuffling has a biomechanical analogue in the world of insects. Females of predator fly Ormia ochracea feed on crickets, and seek their prey at night, by homing on the crickets' chirp. The distance between the fly's timpanic membranes is too short to be a reliable sound localization instrument. However, the fly possesses a system of ligaments that converts minor phase differences between left and right signals into substantial level differences. In the 21st century the Ormia ochracea hearing apparatus became a model for supercompact microelectromechanical stereo microphones intended for hearing aids. Developers claim that such microphones can improve localization, and at the same time improve legibility of amplified speech in noisy environments.

== Sources ==
=== Patent ===
- Official publication: Blumlein, A. D. (1933), British Patent Specification 394,325 'Improvements in and relating to Sound-transmission, Sound-recording and Sound-reproducing Systems' (PDF) (British Patent Office ed.)
- American reprint: Blumlein, A. D. (1958). "British Patent Specification 394,325 'Improvements in and relating to Sound-transmission, Sound-recording and Sound-reproducing Systems'" (PDF). Journal of the Audio Engineering Society. 6 (2): 32–40.
- Memorandums to Isaac Shoenberg:
  - Typewritten memo, 21 July 1932: Blumlein A.D. (1932). "Binaural Reproduction" (PDF). British Library.
  - Handwritten memo, 4 July 1932: Blumlein A.D. (1932). "Binaural Reproduction" (PDF). British Library.

=== Biographies ===
- Alexander, R. (2013). The Inventor of Stereo: The Life and Works of Alan Dower Blumlein. CRC Press. ISBN 9781136120381.
- Burns, R.W. (2006). The Life and Times of A. D. Blumlein. Institution of Engineering and Technology. ISBN 9780852967737.

=== Journal articles ===
- Fox, Barry (1982a). "Early Stereo Recording" (PDF). Studio Sound (May): 36–42.
- Fox, Barry (1982b). "The Briton who invented electronics". New Scientist (3 June): 641–643.
  - Australian reprint: Fox, Barry (1983). "Alan Blumlein: Wartime Radar Pioneer" (PDF). Electronics Australia (March): 14–19.
- Gerzon, Michael (1986). "Stereo Shuffling: New Approach, Old Technique" (PDF). Studio Sound (July).
- Gerzon, Michael (1994). "Application of Blumlein Shuffling to Stereo Microphone Techniques" (PDF). Journal of the Audio Engineering Society. 42 (June): 435–453.
- Gray, M. (1986). "The Birth of Decca Stereo" (PDF). The ARSC Journal (1–3): 4–19.
- Hope, A. (1979). "Surround Sound Patents" (PDF). Wireless World (January): 57–58.
- Scroggie, Marcus (1960). "The Genius of A. D. Blumlein" (PDF). Wireless World (September): 451–456.

=== Reviews and encyclopaedias ===
- Brock-Nannestad, G. (2009). "The development of recording technologies". The Cambridge Companion to Recorded Music. Cambridge University Press. ISBN 9780521865821.
- Peter Copeland (September 2008), Manual of Analogue Sound Restoration Techniques (PDF), British Library, Wikidata Q29471641
- Eargle, John (2012). The Microphone Book: From Mono to Stereo to Surround. CRC Press. ISBN 9781136118067.
- Eargle, John (2013). Handbook of Recording Engineering. Springer. ISBN 9781475711295.
- Morton, D. (2006). Sound Recording: The Life Story of a Technology. JHU Press. ISBN 9780801883989.
- Opstal, J. (2016). The Auditory System and Human Sound-Localization Behavior. Academic Press. ISBN 9780128017258.
- Osborne, R. (2014). Vinyl: A History of the Analogue Record. Ashgate. ISBN 9781472434333.
- Sergi, G. (2004). The Dolby Era: Film Sound in Contemporary Hollywood. Manchester University Press. ISBN 9780719070679.
- Théberge, P.; Devine, K.; Everrett, T. (2015). Living Stereo: Histories and Cultures of Multichannel Sound. Bloomsbury Publishing USA. ISBN 9781623565510.
- Аполлонова, Л. П.; Шумова, Н. Д. (1978). Механическая грамзапись [Mechanical recording] (in Russian). Энергия.
