= Phase 4 Stereo =

U.K. Decca Records label

Phase 4 Stereo was a recording process created by the U.K. Decca Records label in 1961. The process was used on U.K. Decca recordings and also those of its American subsidiary London Records during the 1960s.

Phase 4 Stereo recordings were created with an innovative 10-channel, and later 20-channel, "recording console".

Approximately two hundred albums were released with the process, including popular music, "gimmick" records engineered to make the sound travel from speaker to speaker, records featuring percussion effects, and historical sound effect records. In 1964, a light classical Phase 4 "Concert Series" was produced. The label was a major financial success for Decca.

== History and development ==
By the end of the 1940s Decca had consolidated a prestige among music lovers in the field of high-fidelity music recording through its ffrr (full frequency range recording) series. These recordings took advantage of the technological advances developed by the firm during World War II at the request of the Royal Navy. In the hands of innovative sound engineers like Kenneth Wilkinson, the recordings of the Decca-London stood out for their wide frequency response and good resolution.

The ffrr series continued at the end of the following decade by another development in stereo sound called ffss (full frequency stereo sound), equally appreciated for its quality. The sound shots were obtained by three omnidirectional microphones suspended at nearly 5 ', (1.5 meters) over the orchestral group (the Decca tree).

== The Four Phases ==
Phase 4 Stereo was the label of Decca-London to compete in this segment. It was initiated by the American record producer Tony D'Amato.

== Releases ==
The sound engineers Arthur Lilley and Arthur Bannister made most of the series' recordings, but it was Bannister who used sound manipulation with more exaggeration. During the initial stage, some artists of the Decca's easy listening catalogues participated in the series, such as Eric Rogers, Ted Heath, Werner Müller, Ronnie Aldrich, Edmundo Ros or Stanley Black. The series was successful in sales and a total of about 300 long-play albums were published.

In 1964 Decca-London decided to include within the label a series with works of classical music known and accepted by the general public (Concert Series). The task initially fell to the easy listening director, Stanley Black. These recordings were not well received by specialized critics who described them as having an unnatural sound and the director's approach being superficial.

However, Leopold Stokowski, always keen on the popularization of the great classics, had no objection in making several recordings for Phase 4 Stereo Concert Series, and was followed by other established conductors such as Antal Doráti, Erich Leinsdorf, Anatole Fistoulari, Charles Munch, Lorin Maazel and Bernard Herrmann.

In the series of classical repertoire almost 200 albums were released. At the same time Decca continued recording classical music and popular music with traditional criteria. According to D'Amato "they never dismissed Phase 4... because it was making too much money ...for the company". The series was phased out in 1979, and almost all Phase 4 Stereo LPs were reissued on compact discs, including the classical music series.

In 1996 a CD, The Phase 4 Experience, was released with classical and soundtrack recordings from 1966 to 1979 (London 444 788-2 LPX/PY 871). In 2014, a 41-CD boxed set of Stereo Concert Series classical albums was released, and in 2017 another 40-CD box set of soundtrack and Easy listening/popular recordings, called Spectacular: Nice 'n' Easy.

A space themed version, An Astromusical Odyssey, was arranged by Johnny Keating which included songs from the late 1960s to the early 1970s. A selection can be heard on YouTube.

== See also ==
- Lists of record labels
