= Microphone practice =

Techniques used for recording sound

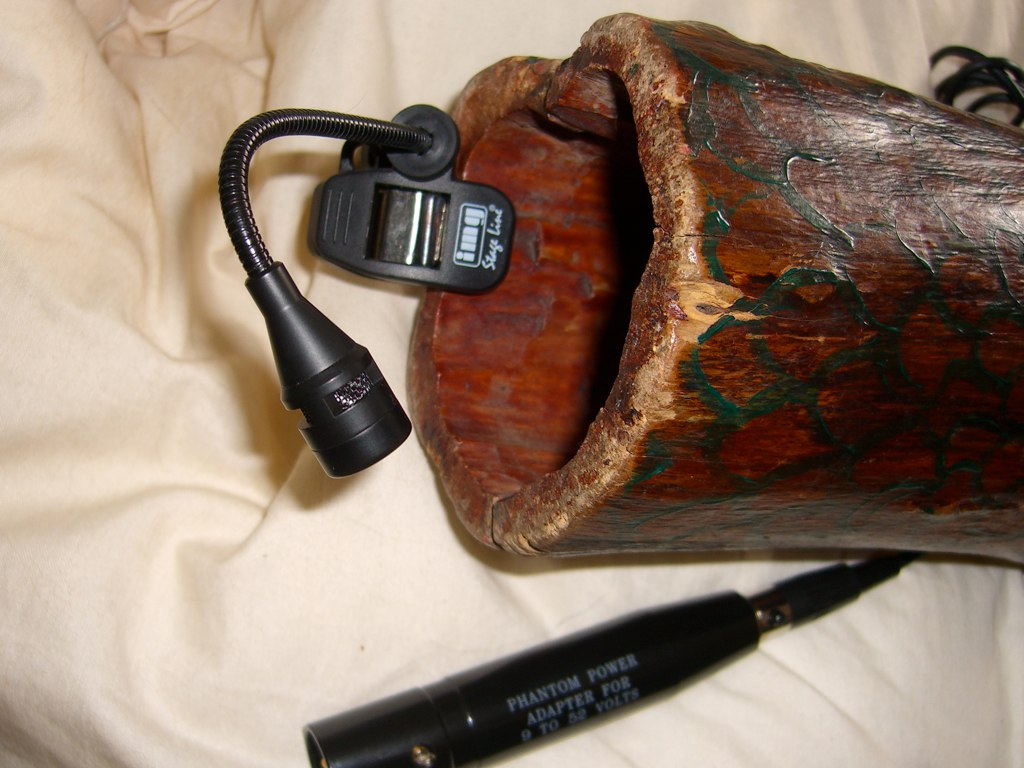
A didgeridoo miked with a small phantom powered condenser microphone that clips onto the instrument.

There are a number of well-developed microphone techniques used for recording musical, film, or voice sources or picking up sounds as part of sound reinforcement systems. The choice of technique depends on a number of factors, including:

- The wish to capture or avoid the collection of extraneous noise. This can be a concern, especially in amplified performances, where audio feedback can be a significant problem. Alternatively, it can be a desired outcome, in situations where ambient noise is useful such as capturing hall reverberation and audience reactions in a live recording.
- Degree of directionality of pickup: in some settings, such as a home video of a birthday party, the person may wish to pick up all the sounds in the room, making an omnidirectional mic desirable. However, if a TV news crew is filming a reporter at a noisy protest, they may only wish to pick up her voice, making a cardioid mic more desirable.
- Choice of a signal type: Mono, stereo or multi-channel.
- Type of sound source: Acoustic instruments produce a sound very different from amplified electric instruments, which are again different from the human voice.
- Sound pressure levels: a mic that is recording Baroque lute will not face high sound pressure levels, however, a mic being used to record heavy metal drumming or brass instrument may face extreme sound pressure levels, potentially causing distortion in the signal.
- Situational circumstances: Sometimes a microphone should not be visible, or having a microphone nearby is not appropriate. In scenes for a movie the microphone may be held above, out of the picture frame.
- Processing: If the signal is destined to be heavily processed, or mixed down, a different type of input may be required.
- The use of a windscreen for outdoor recording or a pop shield to reduce vocal plosives.

== Basic techniques ==
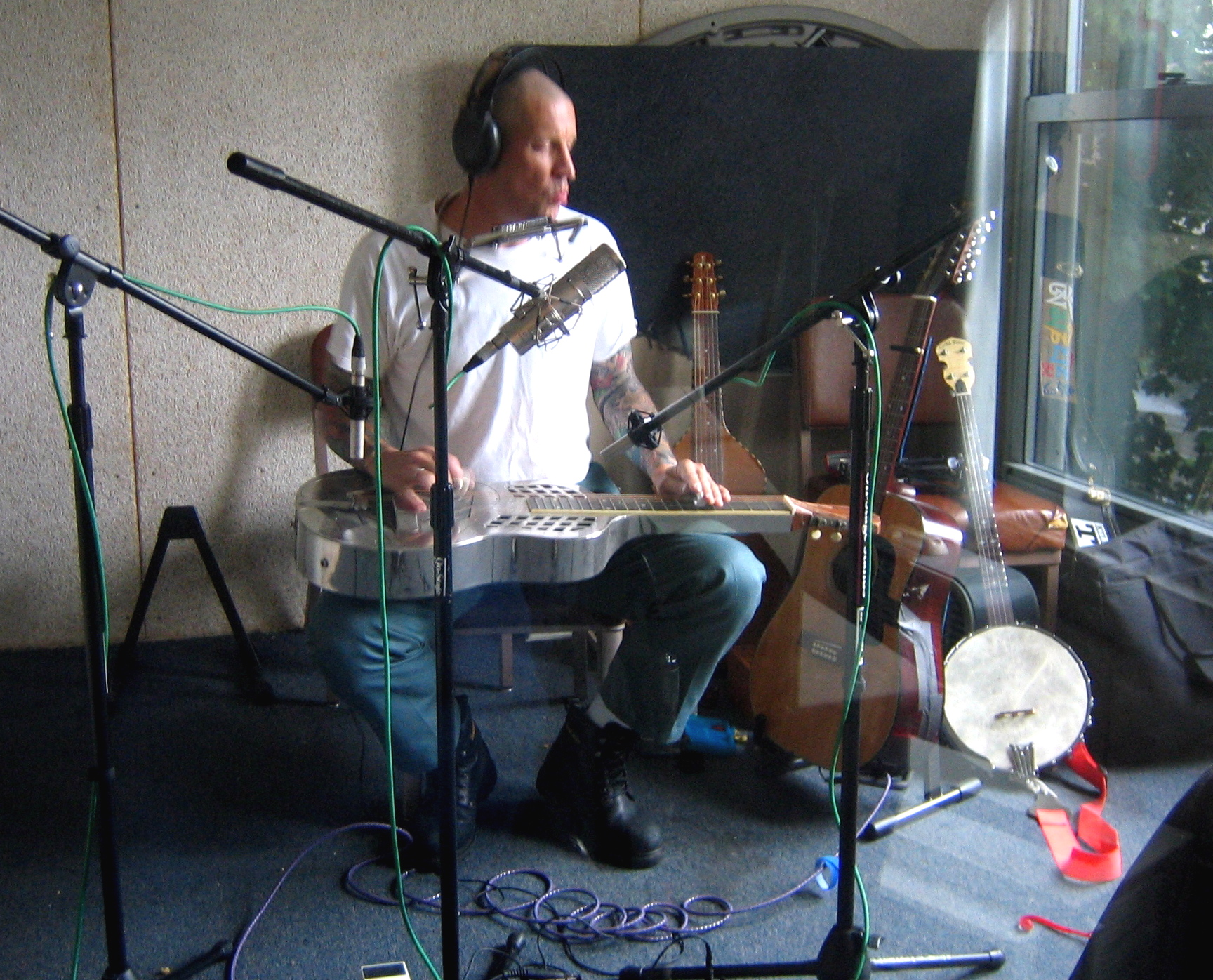
Lloyd Thayer playing National Steel guitar on a radio show.

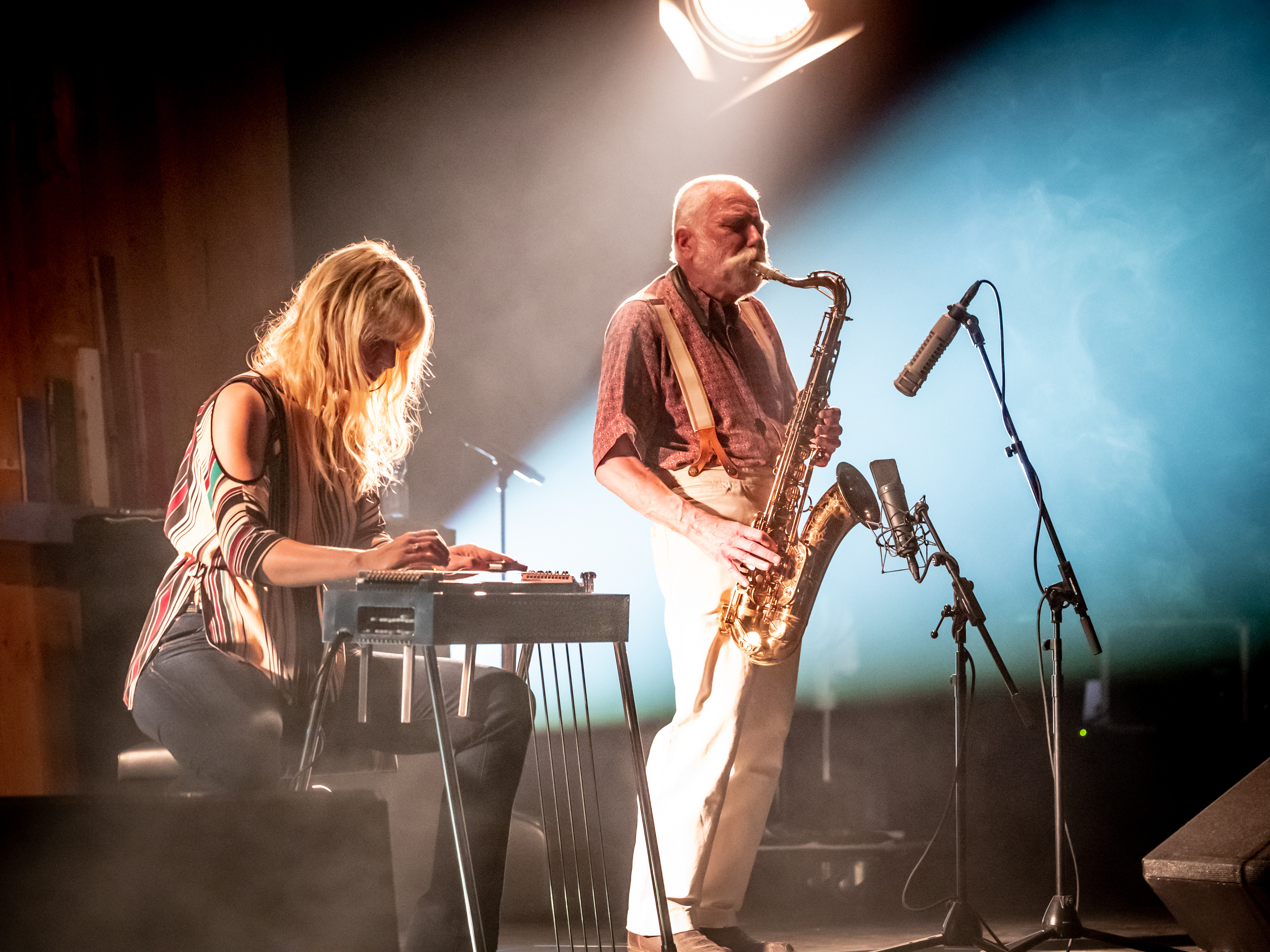
Peter Brötzmann with a tenor saxophone and two microphones (a Neumann U 87 for the bell, an Electro-Voice RE20 for the body).

There are several classes of microphone placement for recording and amplification.

- In close miking, a microphone is placed relatively close to an instrument or sound source, within three to twelve inches, producing a dry or non-reverberant sound. This serves to reduce extraneous noise, including room reverberation and is commonly used when attempting to record a number of separate instruments while keeping the signals separate, or when trying to avoid feedback in an amplified performance. Close miking often affects the frequency response of the microphone, especially for directional mics that exhibit bass boost from the proximity effect. Ubiquitous in the tracking of instruments used in pop and popular music, examples of close-mic vocal tracks include many songs on Elliott Smith's Elliott Smith and Either/Or, Lily Allen's "The Fear", the chorus of Fergie's "Glamorous", Imogen Heap's lead on "Hide and Seek", and Madonna's spoken verses on "Erotica". Recently, Billie Eilish's signature use of close-mic vocals further ascended the technique's popularity among a newer generation of artists, which Pitchfork correlated to the rise of ASMR.
- In ambient or distant miking, a microphone – typically a sensitive one – is placed at some distance from the sound source. The goal of this technique is to get a broader, natural mix of the sound source or sources, along with ambient sound, including reverberation from the room or hall. Example include The Jesus and Mary Chain's Psychocandy (excepting the vocals), Robert Plant's vocals on songs from Physical Graffiti, Tom Waits's lead vocals on his junkyard records, and Mick Jagger's lead-vocals on songs from Exile On Main Street.
- In room miking a distant mic, referred to as the room mic, is used in conjunction with a close mic, the room mic is "typically placed far enough past the critical distance in a room that the room's ambience and reverberations transduce at an equivalent, if not greater, volume than the sound source itself." Ubiquitous in pop, it is the industry standard for tracking rhythm guitars in rock. A celebrated example is the rhythm guitar on Led Zeppelin's "Communication Breakdown" while other examples include John Frusciante's electric guitar parts on BloodSugarSexMagik, Noel Gallagher's lead-guitar on "Champagne Supernova", and Billy Corgan's guitar on "Cherub Rock", "Today", "Bullet With Butterfly Wings", "Zero", and "Fuck You (An Ode to No One)".
- Accent (or spot) microphone placement. Often, the tonal and ambient qualities will sound very different between a distant- and close-miked pickup. Under certain circumstances, it's difficult to obtain a naturally recorded balance when mixing the two together. For example, if a solo instrument within an orchestra needs an extra mic for added volume and presence, placing the mic too close would result in a pickup that sounds overly present, unnatural and out of context with the distant, overall orchestral pickup. To avoid this pitfall, a compromise in distance may be struck. A microphone that has been placed within a reasonably close range to an instrument or section within a larger ensemble (but not so close as to have an unnatural sound) is known as an accent (or spot) pickup. The amount of accent signal that's introduced into the mix should sound natural relative to the overall pickup, and a good accent mic should only add presence to a solo passage and not stick out as a separate, identifiable pickup.
- Instrumental use of microphones has been developed by many experimental composers, musicians and sound artists. They use microphones in unconventional ways, for example by preparing them with objects, moving them around or using contact microphones to colour the sound and be able to amplify otherwise very quiet sounds. Karlheinz Stockhausen used microphone movements by musicians in Mikrophonie I to discover the diverse sounds of a big tam-tam and Pauline Oliveros amplified apple boxes with contact microphones.

When using multiple microphones, respecting a 3-to-1 rule and placing microphones at least three times further from each other than they are from the source they are being used to pick up avoids cancellation and phase issues such as comb filtering when the microphone signals are mixed together.

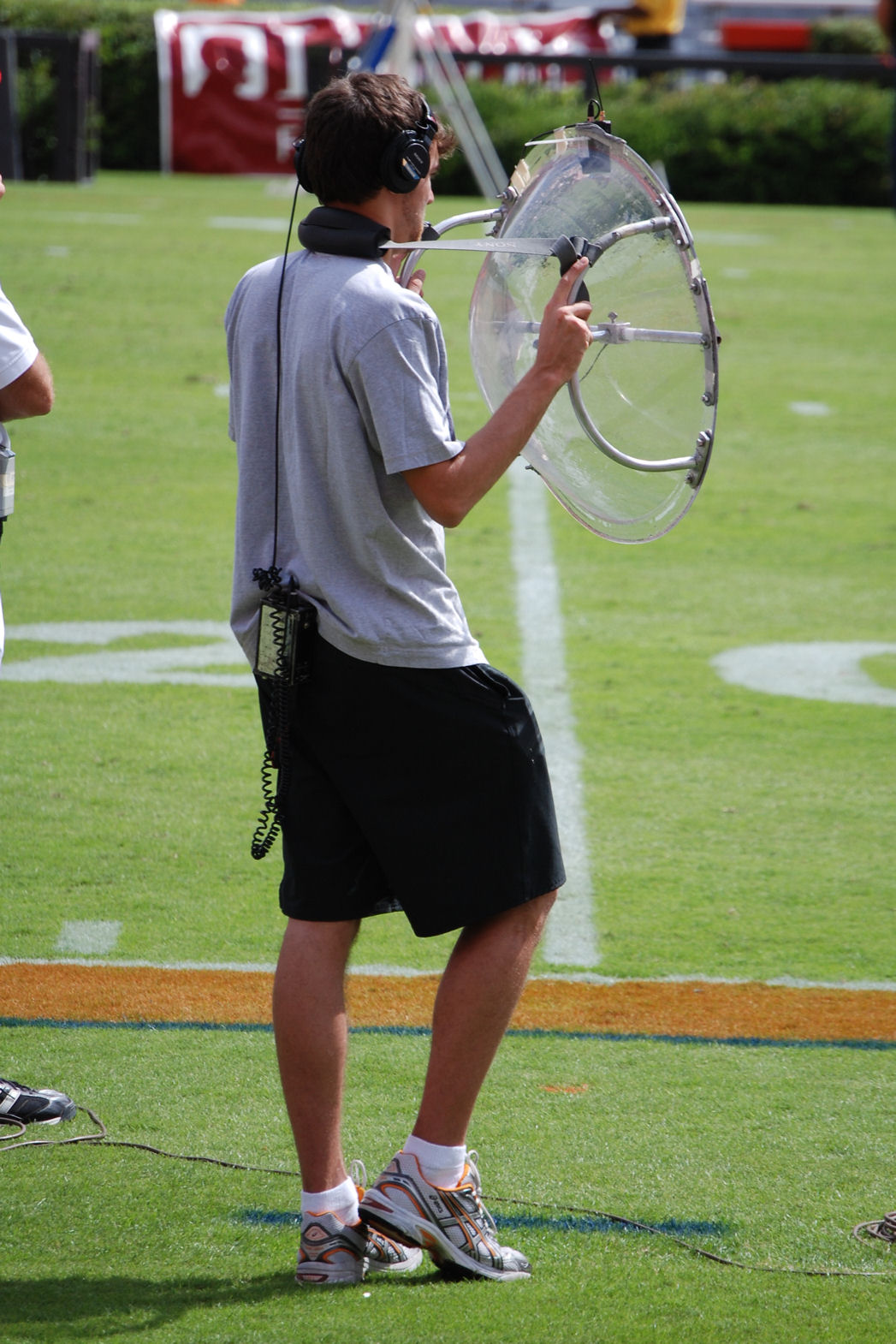
A parabolic microphone used to capture sounds on the field during a football game.

Parabolic microphones are used to capture sounds on the field during football games. The parabolic dish has been compared metaphorically to a telephoto lens, in the way that it can focus the capture of sound.

== Multitrack recording ==
In multitrack recording often each instrument or vocalist is miked separately, with one or more microphones recording to separate tracks. Microphones may also be used to record the overall performance or just the ambiance of the performance space. At a later stage, the channels are combined into two channels for stereo or more for surround sound. Different levels from individual tracks are sent to final channels to position the elements in the stereo or surround sound-stage. The artists need not perform in the same place at the same time, and individual tracks (or sections of tracks) can be re-recorded to correct errors. Multitrack recording permits greater control over the final sound, but recording two channels (stereo recording) is simpler and cheaper, and can give a sound that is more natural.

== Stereo recording techniques ==
There are two features of sound that the human brain uses to place objects in the stereo soundfield between the loudspeakers. These are the relative level difference between the two channels Δ L, and the time delay difference in arrival times for the same sound in each channel Δ t. There are several established microphone configurations used in ambient or room stereo recording.

=== X-Y technique ===
XY stereo

The X-Y technique uses two directional microphones at the same place, and typically rotated 90° or more with respect to each other. A stereo effect is achieved through differences in pickup level between two microphones due to their directionality. Due to the lack of difference in time-of-arrival, the sonic characteristic of X-Y recordings is generally less spacey and has less depth compared to recordings employing an AB setup.

Blumlein pair stereo

When the microphones used are bidirectional and placed facing ±45° with respect to the sound source, the X-Y setup is called a Blumlein pair. The sonic image produced by this configuration is considered by many authorities to create a realistic soundstage.

A further refinement of the Blumlein pair was developed by EMI in 1958, who called it Stereosonic. They added in-phase crosstalk above 700 Hz to better align the mid and treble phantom sources with the bass ones.

=== A-B technique ===
A-B technique uses two parallel microphones, typically omnidirectional, some distance apart, capturing time-of-arrival stereo information as well as some level (amplitude) difference information, especially if employed close to the sound source(s). At a separation distance of about 50 cm, the time delay for a signal reaching first one and then the other microphone from the side is approximately 1.5 ms. If the distance is increased between the microphones it effectively decreases the pickup angle. At 70 cm distance, it is about equivalent to the pickup angle of the near-coincident ORTF setup.

=== M/S technique ===
Mid-side stereo

Mid/side coincident technique employs a bidirectional microphone (with a figure of 8 polar pattern) facing sideways (Side) and a cardioid (generally a variety of cardioid, although Alan Blumlein described the usage of an omnidirectional transducer in his original patent) facing the sound source (Mid). The capsules are stacked vertically and brought together as closely as possible to minimize comb filtering caused by differences in arrival time.

The left and right channels are produced through a simple matrix: Left = Mid + Side, Right = Mid − Side ("minus" indicates you add the side signal with the polarity reversed). This configuration produces a completely mono-compatible signal and, if the Mid and Side signals are recorded (rather than the matrixed Left and Right), the stereo width (and with that, the perceived distance of the sound source) can be manipulated after the recording has taken place.

If the mid/side technique is incorporated into a self-contained stereo microphone assembly that outputs only the final left and right stereo pair signals, the original mid and side signals may still be recovered, permitting the above-mentioned manipulation. The mid signal is recovered by adding the left and right signals; The in phase and antiphase side signals cancel, giving a true mono signal in the process. The side signal is recovered by subtracting the right signal from the left; The mid signal is present in both channels and therefore cancels, leaving the side.

=== Jecklin disk technique ===
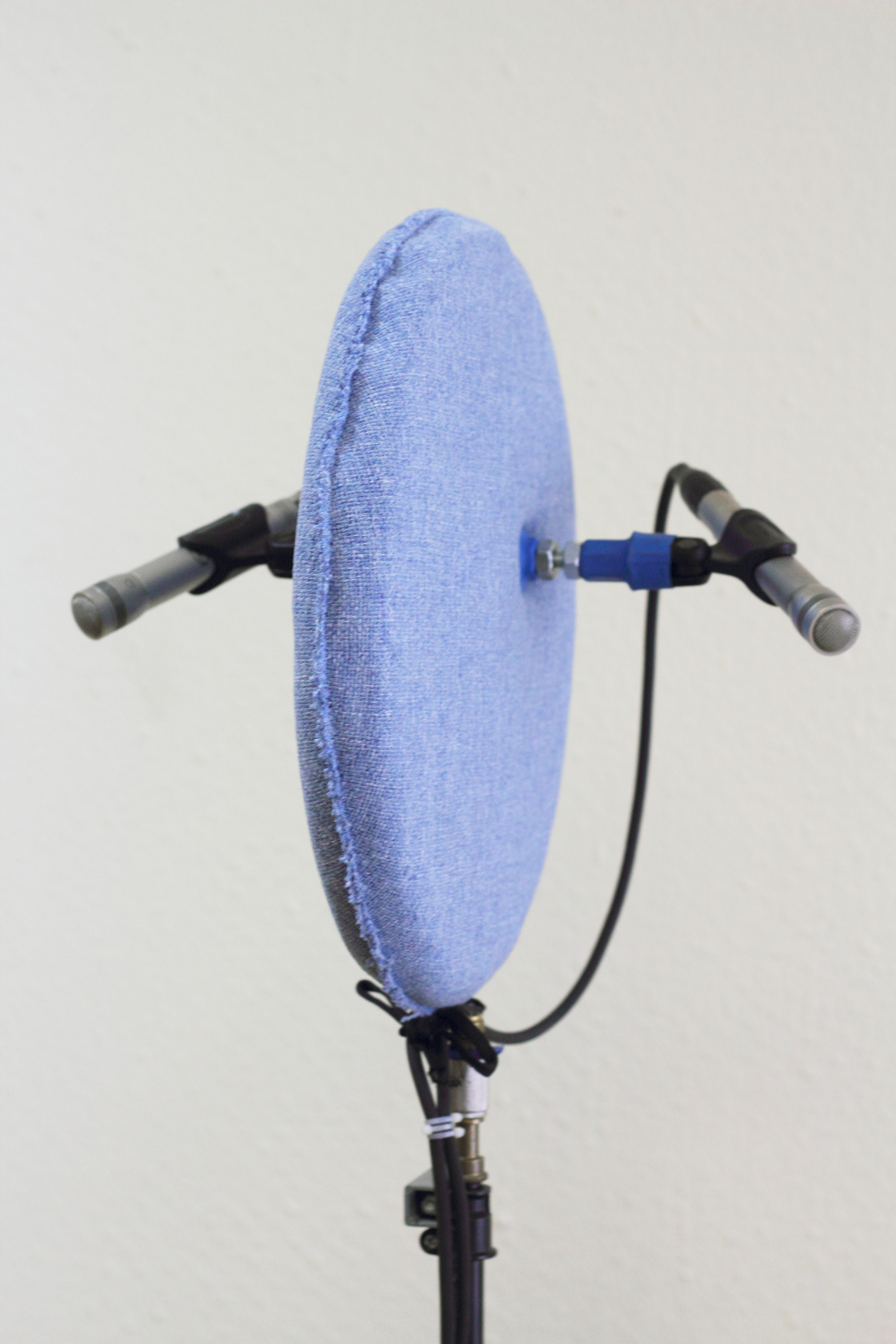
Jecklin Disk

The Jecklin disk technique is similar to A-B recording, using two omnidirectional microphones spaced 36 cm apart. A sound-absorbing Jecklin disk with 35 cm diameter is placed between the two microphones. The disk makes the apparent separation between the mics much larger than an equivalent A-B recording.

=== Choosing a technique ===
If a stereo signal is to be reproduced in mono, out-of-phase parts of the signal will cancel, which may cause the unwanted reduction or loss of some parts of the signal. Mono compatibility can be an important factor in choosing which technique to use.

- Since the A-B techniques use phase differences to give the stereo image, they are the least compatible with mono.
- The Jecklin disk has a relatively small distance between the mics. Frequencies coming in sideways can reach only one microphone and will not interfere. Therefore, the Jecklin disk works reasonably well when converted to mono. The Jecklin disk also gives phase shifts and amplitude differences matching well with what a real pair of ears would hear at this position and therefore is well suited for headphone playback.
- In the X-Y techniques, the microphones would ideally be in exactly the same place, which is not possible – if they are slightly separated left to right, there may be some loss of high frequencies when played back in mono, so they are often separated vertically. This only causes problems with sound from above or below the height of the microphones.
- The M/S technique is ideal for mono compatibility, since summing Left+Right just gives the Mid signal back.

The equipment for the techniques also varies from bulky to small and convenient. A-B techniques generally use two separate microphone units, often mounted on a bar to define the separation. X-Y microphone capsules can be mounted in one unit or even on the top of a handheld digital recorder.

M/S arrays can be very compact and fit easily into a standard blimp windscreen, which makes boom-operated stereo recordings possible. They provide a variable soundstage width to match a zoom lens, which can be manipulated in post-production. This makes M/S a very popular stereo technique for film location recording. They are often used in small pencil microphones to mount on video cameras, sometimes even coupled to the zoom.
