= Quintessence Records =

- Parent company: Pickwick International Inc.
- Founded: 1976
- Genre: Classical
- Country of origin: United States

Quintessence Records started in 1976. Quintessence was formed by Pickwick International Inc. as a budget label. Pickwick’s trademark for Quintessence was filed on December 10, 1976 with the initial Q made to look like a clef symbol. The label was devoted to the licensed reissue of historic classical recordings. The idea was printed on the record jackets: "Critically acclaimed recordings of the basic repertoire which belong in every library of great music" and also promised these were "Carefully remastered from the original master tapes, recut on the latest Neumann lathes and pressed on virgin vinyl." R. Peter Munves was the executive responsible for the label. Munves had earlier worked for Columbia Records and RCA Records classical music divisions. He said to Time magazine in 1971 “You can call me the P.T. Barnum of the classics”.

Many of the Quintessence records were originally included in Reader's Digest boxed sets produced by Decca Records for RCA Victor. The producer of many of these sets was Charles Gerhardt and the engineer Kenneth Wilkinson. Conductors such as John Barbirolli and Jascha Horenstein and pianist Earl Wild were featured in these reissues.

Series issued included:

- “Critics Choice” (beginning with PMC 7001)
- “Classics for Joy” (beginning possibly with PMC 7010)
- “Stereo Sound Spectaculars” (beginning with vol. 1 on PMC 7063)

Quintessence also licensed and reissued recordings from Sony Music, EMI, Harmonia Mundi, Melodiya, Deutsche Grammophon, RCA, and Supraphon. Some of the material was original monaural but replaced by “electronic stereo” versions.

Many of the record jackets included discographical details such as dates, locales, producers and engineers.

The records listed for $3.98 in the 1970s but can be found in the second hand market for two dollars or less.

Quintessence released both monaural and stereophonic sound discs in the 33-1/3 rpm LP format. LPs were issued in the PMC 7000 series (the P standing for Pickwick) beginning with PMC 7001: Dvorak Symphony No. 9 with the Royal Philharmonic Orchestra conducted by Jascha Horenstein (recorded by Decca for Reader's Digest at Walthamstow Assembly Hall in January 1962). Multiple LP sets were issued in the #PC-3000 series, the # standing for the number of discs.

Some of these same recordings were later reissued on CD by Intersound, Inc.
