= Blumlein =

Blumlein is a surname. Notable people with the surname include:

- Alan Blumlein, electronic engineer
  - Blumlein pair, a stereo recording technique invented by Alan Blumlein
  - Blumlein transmission line, used to create high-voltage pulses with short rise and fall times
- Michael Blumlein, fiction writer and physician
