= R. Peter Munves =

American record executive (1927–2024)

- Born: May 15, 1927
- Died: August 19, 2024 (aged 97)
- Employers: Columbia Records; RCA Records; Quintessence Records

R. Peter Munves (May 15, 1927 – August 19, 2024) was an American record executive. He was an executive in the classical music divisions at Columbia Records, RCA Records, and later was the head of Quintessence Records.
