= Dynamic binaural recording =

Type of binaural recording

Dynamic binaural recording is a type of binaural recording where the sound source appears to change position with the change in position of the user. It is used in virtual reality applications, where the user is moving and the source of sound appears to change position, along with the user in 3D space. A combination of head tracking and binaural recording are used to generate the dynamic binaural recording. The spatial position of the user's head is tracked, and binaural audio which takes account of it is played into headphones. This creates a realistic effect of sound, with freedom of movement to the user.

== See also ==
- Binaural recording
- Head-related transfer function
