= Charles Gerhardt (conductor) =

American conductor (1927–1999)

Charles Allan Gerhardt (February 6, 1927 – February 22, 1999) was an American conductor, record producer, and arranger.

== Early years ==
Gerhardt grew up in Little Rock, Arkansas, where he studied the piano at age five and composition at age nine. He studied music and engineering at several colleges including the University of Illinois, the University of Southern California, and the College of William & Mary. He also studied piano privately and at the Juilliard School. His formal education was interrupted by World War II, during which he served in the Navy in the Aleutians as a chaplain's assistant.

== RCA Victor ==
For a time, he was a clerk at the Record Hunter on Lexington Avenue in New York City. Between 1951 and 1955 he worked on the technical side of RCA Victor records. At first, this role consisted of transferring 78 rpm recordings of Enrico Caruso and Artur Schnabel to tape, including removing surface noise preparatory to LP reissue. He also assisted at sessions for Kirsten Flagstad, Vladimir Horowitz, William Kapell, Wanda Landowska, and Zinka Milanov. In 1954, he worked with Leopold Stokowski and the NBC Symphony Orchestra on the experimental stereophonic recordings of ballet suites from Gian Carlo Menotti's Sebastian and Prokofiev's Romeo and Juliet, which were not commercially released in stereo until 1978. He also became RCA's liaison with Arturo Toscanini, in the conductor's last years. It was Toscanini who encouraged him to study conducting.

For five years Gerhardt worked at Westminster Records in New York. With Westminster struggling (the company filed for bankruptcy in December 1959), he switched to recording pop singers including Eddie Fisher. His great opportunity as a producer came with a call from George R. Marek, the head of RCA Victor's Red Seal department, offering an opportunity to produce recordings for Reader's Digest in England.

== Record producer ==
In 1960, he began to produce records for RCA Victor and Reader's Digest. His partner was the legendary recording engineer Kenneth Wilkinson of Decca Records (then RCA's affiliate in Europe). This was the beginning of a partnership that lasted through 4,000 sessions. Their first major project was a 12-LP set for Reader's Digest Recordings: A Festival of Light Classical Music, issued in both monaural and stereophonic versions. Over two million copies of this set were sold in a few years. In 1961, he produced the Reader's Digest set of Beethoven symphonies with the Royal Philharmonic Orchestra conducted by René Leibowitz.

One of Gerhardt's favorite productions was the 1964 release Treasury of Great Music, another 12-LP set for Reader's Digest. This featured the Royal Philharmonic Orchestra conducted by such eminent figures as Sir John Barbirolli, Sir Malcolm Sargent, Antal Doráti, Jascha Horenstein, Rudolf Kempe, Josef Krips, Charles Münch, Georges Prêtre, and Fritz Reiner.

This was followed in 1966 by the album set All-Time Broadway Hit Parade, which included 120 songs from various musical productions such as Carousel, The Music Man, Guys and Dolls, My Fair Lady, Pal Joey, South Pacific and many more. The songs found on this collection were not recorded by the original artists.

Many of the Reader's Digest recordings were later reissued on LP by Quintessence Records and Chesky Records; a few have been reissued on CD.

== Conductor ==
The Reader's Digest projects created so much recording work that there was a need for another orchestra and conductor in London. Together with violinist and orchestral contractor Sidney Sax, Gerhardt formed an orchestra of top London orchestral and freelance musicians in 1964 for use in his recording sessions. He began to record this group in January 1964. The orchestra was incorporated as the National Philharmonic Orchestra in 1970 and Gerhardt himself conducted it in standard repertory, contemporary works, and film score music. Leopold Stokowski made some of his last recordings with this same orchestra.

Gerhardt had received some training in conducting, as well as advice from Jascha Horenstein. His 1967 conducting of the so-called RCA Victor Symphony Orchestra (which was the National Philharmonic Orchestra) of Howard Hanson's Symphony No. 2 (The Romantic) garnered the praise of the composer.

One particularly successful set Gerhardt conducted with the National Philharmonic Orchestra included the 14 LPs of the Classic Film Scores series for RCA, issued 1972–1978. This started with the 1972 release The Sea Hawk: The Classic Film Scores of Erich Wolfgang Korngold. The whole series was notable, especially for Gerhardt's own, extremely careful, preparation of the scores. Recordings were made in the acoustically outstanding Kingsway Hall and engineered by Kenneth Wilkinson. The producer of the series was George Korngold, the composer's son. The series continued with albums devoted to Max Steiner, Miklós Rózsa, Franz Waxman, Alfred Newman, Dimitri Tiomkin and Bernard Herrmann as well as albums devoted to music in the films of Bette Davis, Humphrey Bogart, and Errol Flynn. Numerous additional pieces were recorded but remain in the vaults. A John Williams recording was made in 1978 to reflect Williams' (Korngold-inspired) scores which had become popular. BMG reissued the Classic Film Scores on CD encoded in Dolby Surround. In 2010, RCA Sony rereleased six of the original CD releases. In 2011, additional albums were reissued. Although the new CDs do not mention it, the reissues still feature Dolby Surround encoding. In 2020 RCA re-released the original recordings from 1972 - 1976 in a 12-CD set.

The Classic Film Scores: Album Title	Released	U.S. LP number	U.K. LP number
The Sea Hawk: The Classic Film Scores of Erich Wolfgang Korngold	1972	LSC 3330	GL 43446
Now Voyager: The Classic Film Scores of Max Steiner	1973	ARL1-0136	SER 5695
Classic Film Scores for Bette Davis	1973	ARL1-0183	GL 43436
Captain from Castile: The Classic Film Scores of Alfred Newman	1973	ARL1-0184	GL 43437
Elizabeth and Essex: The Classic Film Scores of Erich Wolfgang Korngold	1973	ARL1-0185	GL 43438
Casablanca: Classic Film Scores for Humphrey Bogart	1974	ARL1-0422	GL 43449
Gone with the Wind	1974	ARL1-0452	GL 43440
Citizen Kane: The Classic Film Scores of Bernard Herrmann	1974	ARL1-0707	GL 43441
Sunset Boulevard: The Classic Film Scores of Franz Waxman	1974	ARL1-0708	GL 43442
Spellbound: The Classic Film Scores of Miklós Rózsa	1975	ARL1-0911	GL 43443
Captain Blood: Classic Film Scores for Errol Flynn	1975	ARL1-0912	GL 43444
Lost Horizon: The Classic Film Scores of Dimitri Tiomkin	1976	ARL1-1669	GL 43445
Star Wars and Close Encounters of the Third Kind^{1}	1978	ARL1-2698	GL 13650
The Spectacular World of Classic Film Scores^{2}	1978	ARL1-2792	GR 42005

^{1} Released under the title Contemporary Classic Film Scores.
^{2} Compilation album

Another recording he conducted for RCA was flautist James Galway's Annie's Song album with the National Philharmonic Orchestra, which reached number three on the British charts in 1978. A compilation album distributed promotionally in 1989 titled "The Home Video Album" featured the Studio themes and some duplication of "The Spectacular World of Classic Film Scores" but also includes a suite from Dimitri Tiomkin's "The Thing from Another World as well as an amusing version of the 20th Century Fox Title, as orchestrated and performed by John Morris for Mel Brooks' send-up of Alfred Hitchcock, "High Anxiety".

In 1979, Gerhardt conducted the National Philharmonic Orchestra in Korngold's score for the Warner Brothers' 1942 film version of Kings Row, also produced by the composer's son George. This was an early digital audio recording available on the Chalfont Records label, subsequently available on CD through Varèse Sarabande. In 1989 Varèse Sarabande released an album "Music from The Prince and the Pauper" and other films with the National Philharmonic Orchestra (VSD 5207. Along with Korngold, Miklós Rózsa, John Williams, George Antheil, Michael Lewis, Alex North, Leonard Pennario, Georges Delerue and William Walton are represented.

== Illness and death ==
Charles Gerhardt moved to Redding, California, in 1991. He was diagnosed with brain cancer in late November 1998 and died from complications of brain surgery. He is buried at St. Joseph Catholic Cemetery in Redding.
