= Decca tree =

Microphone recording system

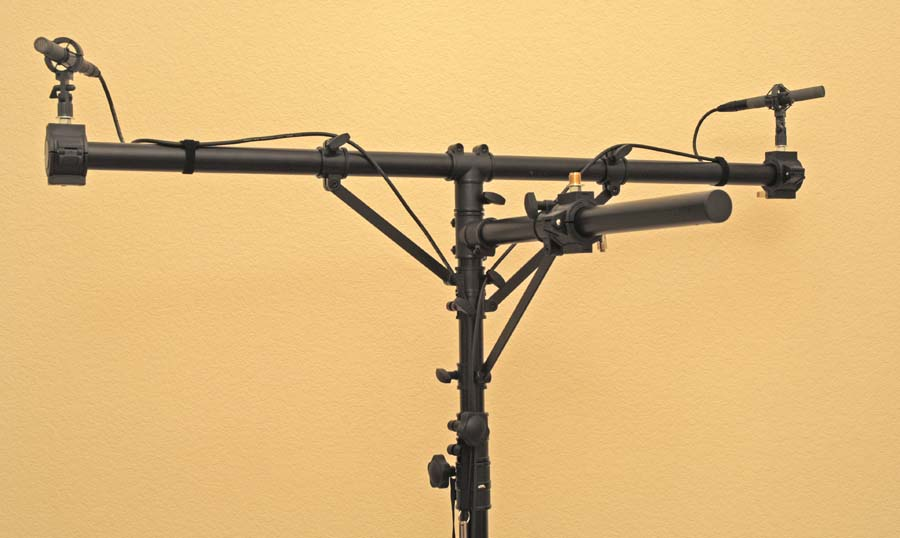
Microphone stand for Decca Tree configuration

The Decca Tree is a spaced microphone array most commonly used for orchestral recording. It was originally developed as a type of stereo A–B recording method adding a center fill. The technique was developed in the early 1950s and first commercially used in 1954 by Arthur Haddy, Roy Wallace, and later refined by engineer Kenneth Ernest Wilkinson and his team at Decca Records and its recording studios, to provide a strong stereo image.

The Decca Tree setup evolved from the idea of a minimal recording technique using a pair of microphones. The first system was developed by Roy Wallace. The microphone triangle was placed about 3 to 3.6 m high above the stage level, near the conductor. The microphone system is not properly in front of the orchestra, but more "into" the orchestra.

Two more microphones can be added and placed on the sides (called "outrigger microphones"), approximately at about 2/3 of the stage width, between the conductor and the outer orchestra boundary.

== Setup ==
Example of microphone positioning in a Decca Tree setup

A Decca Tree setup uses three omnidirectional microphones arranged in a "T" pattern outlining a triangle, often equilateral; the center microphone is mixed with the two spaced microphones to fill the "hole in the middle" in their imaging; it points the sound source. The placement can be done with three separate microphone stands or using one or more bars. In contrast to the ORTF stereo technique, the Decca Tree size is not fixed and may vary considerably; distances between the two back microphones are seen between 0.6 and 1.2 m; the front microphone is set proportionally and can be mounted slightly lower than the outside pair. The recording engineer arbitrarily adjusts these dimensions accordingly to the size of the ensemble, the dimensions of the room and the type of music. Microphone manufacturer Schoeps advises to put the three microphones at least 1.5 m apart to reduce crosstalk and excessive correlation at low frequencies (for example, setting the microphone width to 2 m and the depth to 1.5 m).

Former Decca engineer John Pellowe describes the specifics of the setup as follows:

Well, we used to have a thing called a Decca Tree which was an arrangement where [at] the front edge of an orchestra about 3.2 metres up in the sky you would have a centre microphone roughly in line with the edge of the orchestra, and then maybe 2.5 feet back and 5 feet apart you would have 2 more forming a triangle, omnidirectional microphones. These were Neumann [M50] I'm talking about. [...]

The centre microphone would be looking right into the centre of the strings in front of the conductor. You would have the conductor out front, then there would be a couple of desks of strings before you get to the woodwinds, and we would be looking right into the centre of those strings with that microphone. Then we would have the [rear] two, the left and right [mics on the] tree, which would again be looking right into the first violins and the celli, if that was the way the orchestra was set out, and then we would have a couple of outriggers which were maybe twenty feet apart 3.2 metres high again, 10 foot 6, and they again would be omnidirectional [...] 5 feet away from the edge of the orchestra 10'6" high looking down into the strings. [...] It was a very controversial method of recording, because when you have that many spaced omnidirectional microphones you lose a lot of the directional cues, which is absolutely right, the way that we would deal with that was we would pan the left and right tree half left and half right, and the outrigger mics we would pan hard left and right and we would paint an artificial stereo image. [...] The reason we did this and consistently did it and got away with it and got wonderful reviews and many many awards was simply that the localisation cues were missing, but the sound was fantastic.

The reason that the Decca system survived as long as it did was that it was comparatively adaptable to different acoustic spaces. It was comparatively easy to auto-balance it and you didn't have to fiddle with it much, generally speaking in order to make it reliable.

The Decca Tree was originally used in orchestral situations, fitted on a tall boom and suspended in the air, roughly above the conductor.

== Microphones ==
The technique traditionally uses three omnidirectional microphones, traditionally of the Neumann M 50 small-diaphragm pressure transducer tube condenser type, to record in stereo. These microphones are not truly omnidirectional at the higher frequencies, but exhibit some high frequency lift and directionality which is likely to positively affect stereo imaging of the Decca Tree arrangement. Variations have been performed using a coincident pair, in X-Y, Mid/Side (M/S), or Blumlein positioning, in place of the center microphone. The Neumann M 49, KM 53, and KM 56 were also evaluated and used for early sessions by the Decca team, and later the Schoeps MK 2S were used by the team for live productions where the M 50 proved too cumbersome.

== Applications ==
The Decca Tree is a stereo miking technique often used in large orchestral or choir performances, but it can also be used as a room miking technique. When used for room miking of drums, its wide stereo image captures the nuances of bigger environments better than most other techniques. In smaller rooms however, the Decca Tree does not work as well.
