= Arthur C. Keller =

American scientist

- Born: August 18, 1901; New York, United States
- Died: August 25, 1983 (aged 82); Bronxville, New York, USA
- Education: Cooper Union; Yale University; Columbia University
- Known for: Sound recording and reproduction
- Awards: Institute of Radio Engineers Fellow (1961); Audio Engineering Society Gold Medal (1981)
- Scientific career
- Fields: Electrical Engineering
- Workplaces: Western Electric; Bell Laboratories

Arthur C. Keller (August 18, 1901 – August 25, 1983) was a pioneer of high-fidelity and stereophonic recording techniques.

He attended Cooper Union, Yale University and Columbia University. He joined the engineering department of Western Electric in 1917, and became an employee of Bell Laboratories in 1925.

Keller's invention of a "moving-coil" playback stylus made possible the first hi-fi records. In 1931-32 Keller made the first known stereophonic and high-fidelity recordings of orchestral music. On April 19, 1938, Keller was issued US patent number 2,114,471 for his idea of recording the two channels of a stereo recording in one record groove each at 45 degrees from vertical.

Keller led the design team at Bell Laboratories which developed the first modern wire wrap tools.

Keller was awarded the Gold Medal from the Audio Engineering Society in 1981 for outstanding developments in stereophonic disk recording. He was a Fellow of the Acoustical Society of America and the Institute of Electrical and Electronics Engineers, and a member of the American Physical Society and the Yale Engineering Association.

In August 1928, Keller married Margaret D. McHale (1906?–1989?). Their daughter Margaret Gwendolyn Keller was born in 1936. He died on August 25, 1983, in Bronxville, New York; he was eighty-two. Upon his death he was survived by his widow, his daughter, and two granddaughters.
