= Binaural recording =

Method of recording sound

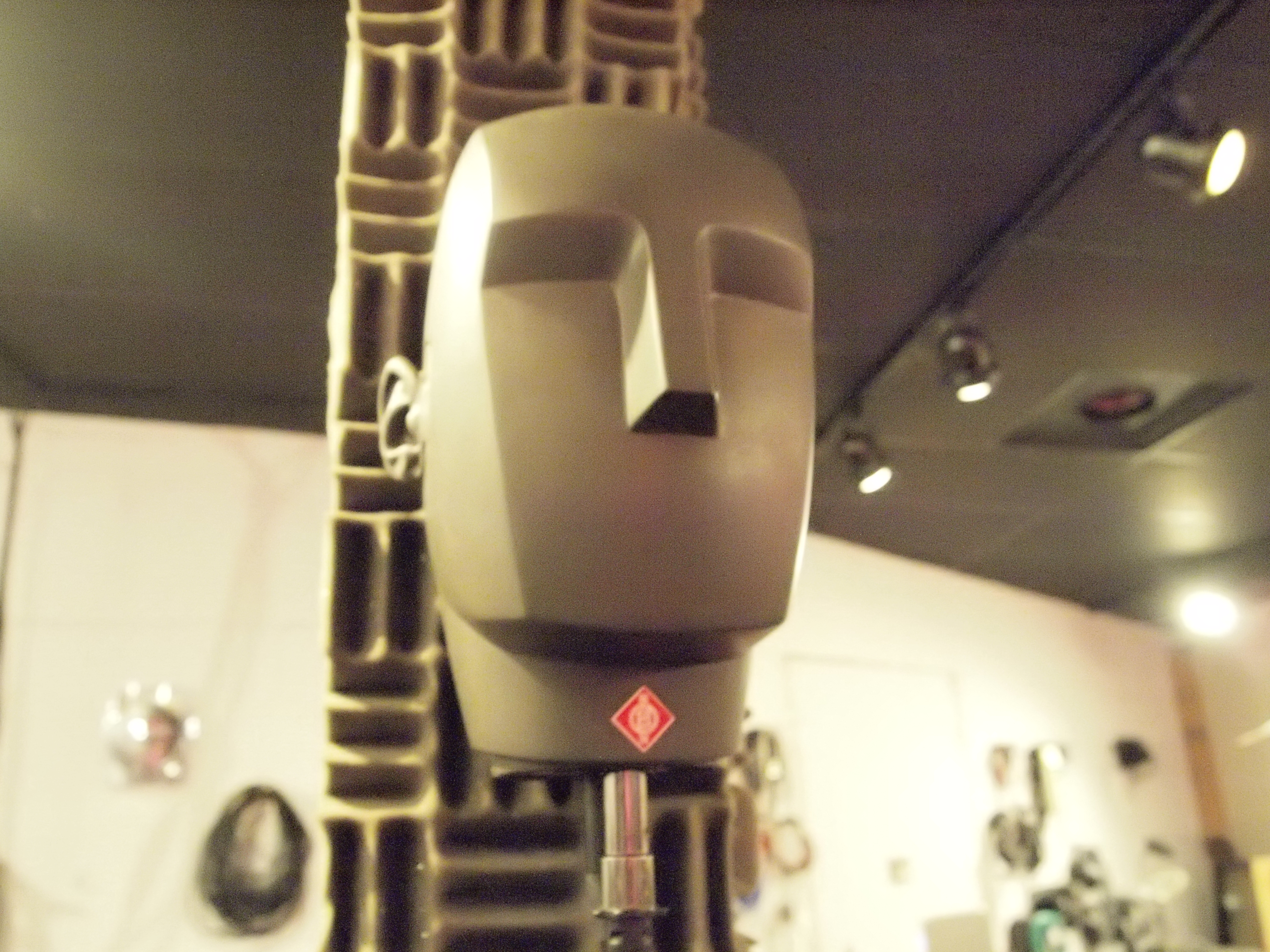
Neumann KU 100 microphone used to record binaural sound

Binaural recording is a method of recording sound that uses two microphones, arranged with the intent to create a 3D stereo sound sensation for the listener of actually being in the room with the performers or instruments. This effect is often created using a technique known as dummy head recording, wherein a mannequin head is fitted with a microphone in each ear. Binaural recording is intended for replay using headphones and will not translate properly over stereo speakers. This idea of a three-dimensional or internal form of sound has also translated into useful advancement of technology in many things such as stethoscopes creating in-head acoustics and IMAX movies being able to create a three-dimensional acoustic experience.

The term binaural has frequently been confused as a synonym for the word stereo, due in part to systematic use in the mid-1950s by the recording industry, as a marketing buzzword. Conventional stereo recordings do not factor in natural ear spacing or head shadow of the head and ears, since these things happen naturally as a person listens, generating interaural time differences (ITDs) and interaural level differences (ILDs) specific to their listening position.

== History ==
The history of binaural recording goes back to 1881. The first binaural unit, the théâtrophone, was invented by Clément Ader. It consisted of an array of spaced pairs of carbon pencil microphones installed along the front edge of the Opera Garnier. The signal was sent to subscribers through the telephone system, and required that they hold a headset up to each ear.

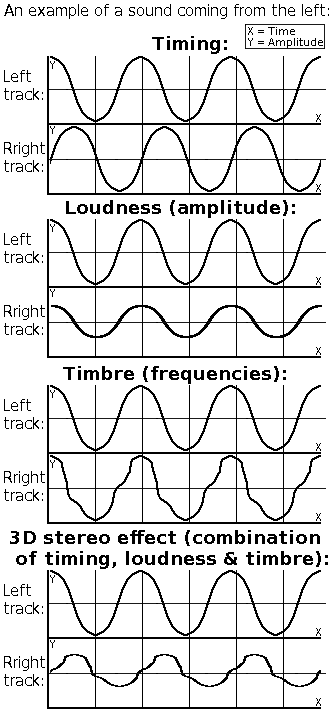
The key constituents that cause the 3D stereo effect: timing, loudness and timbre. Sound coming from the left arrives first to the left ear and microseconds later to the right ear. Head muffles the sound making the sound louder to the left ear than to the right ear. The head and other parts of the body deflect the sound thus changing the sound's frequency spectrum along its way from the left side to the right side. The human brain interprets these differences and automatically causes a sensation of a certain location for the sound to the listening person.

In the early 1930s, several binaural heads were developed. One, referred to as "Oscar" was made by Bell Labs, using 1.4 in (36 mm) microphones inserted into the cheeks of a mannequin's head, and was demonstrated at the World Fair in Chicago, in 1933. The Dutch firm, Philips, also developed a binaural head, with the microphones located at the ears, which produced a better result. These early adaptations of the mannequins used in shops to model clothes led to the moniker dummy head.

Over the course of the 20th century, advancements in microphone design and an understanding of the significance that the anatomy of the human ear played in the localization of sound led to further developments in the design of binaural heads. Their use ranged from acoustic analysis, such as to record word scoring for speech intelligibility measurement, hearing aid design, for music reproduction, and radio drama.

Demolition (1973) was the first radio drama recorded using a dummy head.

In 1974, Virgin Records issued the first solo album by Tangerine Dream's leader Edgar Froese, titled Aqua. The sleeve notes inform listeners that the tracks NGC 891 and Upland were recorded using a binaural head system developed by Gunther Brunschen. Listeners were advised to listen with stereo headphones. Although Edgar was keen to continue to use this system for subsequent recordings, it was abandoned because although it worked well through headphones, the improved sound quality did not translate adequately to a hi-fi speaker system.

In 1972, Neumann released the KU80 binaural head, which would eventually lead to the KU100 binaural head, which is widely used today.

In 1978, Lou Reed released the first commercially produced binaural pop record, Street Hassle, a combination of live and studio recordings.

During the 1990s, electronic devices which used digital signal processing (DSP) to reproduce head-related transfer functions (HRTFs) were made commercially available. These devices allowed the sound engineer to make it sound like a monophonic sound had been recorded with a binaural head, adjusting the apparent direction and proximity of a sound in real time. They were unusual and expensive, but would allow the sound engineer to alter special effects of prerecorded sounds quickly and conveniently. Software versions of these are now widely available.

In 2015, Singaporean singer-songwriter JJ Lin released his debut experimental album From M.E. to Myself, using dummy head recording. This is also the first full album in the pop music industry to use this technology.

In 2015, the UK-based theatre company Complicité presented The Encounter, where an audience of up to 850 people wore wired headphones listening to a binaural soundscape that featured both binaural recordings and the sound from a KU100 binaural head onstage, which relayed sound from the performer onstage. The show toured the world, and played on Broadway for several months, winning a Tony Award for its sound design.

Binaural sound is often used in Virtual Reality, to help the user locate the source of something outside their field of vision. It also helps the user feel immersed in the experience by creating a realistic sonic landscape. Typically, this form of binaural sound is created by using monophonic recordings of sound that are processed through a binaural panner (and other processes that simulate distance, occlusion and acoustics) in real-time, based on where the user is facing.

The online ASMR community has widely employed binaural recordings.

Many of the major music streaming services have started offering "Spatial Audio" versions of popular music. These are often mixed using Dolby Atmos, which combines cinematic-style surround sound panning with object based panning. A smart phone, tablet or computer can be used to listen to these with headphones and the music track will be rendered into binaural sound on playback. Devices like Apple's AirPods Pro can be used to track the rotation of the users head and allow the music sources to rotate around the listener as they rotate their head.

The increasing popularity of podcasts has seen an increase in audio drama production, and there have been many produced using binaural recording, or by recording in mono and mixing those recordings using Dolby Atmos.

== Recording techniques ==
Binaural recording of speech and paper crumpling
A binaural recording. The desired effect can be achieved only with stereo headphones.

"One Man Rumba" binaural musical demonstration
A binaural recording. The desired effect can be achieved only with stereo headphones.

The simplest recording technique utilizes two small microphones, placed inside the ears of a human, a technique that can create very impressive first-person perspective recordings. The DPA 4560 was produced specifically for this type of recording. This technique also clearly picks up the sounds of the person wearing the microphones, their breathing, clothing rustle, and any shifts in movement they may make, which can make it impractical for many types of recording.

More common is using a binaural head, also known as a dummy head, or Kunstkopf. These typically have two microphones, 15 cm (5.9 in) apart, facing away from each other, with a head shaped mass between them. Typically these microphones will be embedded within the head with a silicone mould of a pair of ears in front of them.

Some binaural microphones go further and include elements of the human torso, aiming to simulate how sounds are reflected off the shoulders and absorbed by body mass, known as Head and Torso Simulators (HATS). They often include more intricate detail, such as a mouth simulator.

The distance between the ears, the size, weight and shape of the head and ears aim to roughly approximate those of an average human, though as very few people are actually the average size this explains some of the variance in how dramatically a binaural effect is heard by different people.

The aim is that each microphone records sound in the same spatial relationship: each signal having the relative inter-aural time, level and timbral differences that the two ears of a human being would have if they were situated in the same position as the binaural head.

The recordings are then listened to through headphones, with the microphone from the left ear of the binaural head routed into the left headphone of the listener, and the microphone from the right ear routed into the right headphone of the listener. Our brains are then able to interpret the spatial cues within the recordings to create a three-dimensional soundscape within our consciousness because it mirrors our own hearing system.

Like our ears, a binaural head records sounds from all directions: all the sounds of a space and a clear impression of the room acoustics. A binaural head can create exceptional recordings of acoustic music concerts, for example. However, it will also clearly record any noises the audience make too.

A binaural head also mirrors the limitations of the human hearing system too. so for example when a sound is directly in front of us. there is very little difference between the sound hitting our left ear and our right ear. If a sound is directly behind us, again there is very little difference between the sound hitting our left ear and our right ear. Without the help of our visual system, we can struggle to tell if something is directly in front of us, or directly behind us, based on our hearing system alone.

== Examples of binaural microphones ==
=== Brüel & Kjær Head and Torso Simulators (HATS) ===
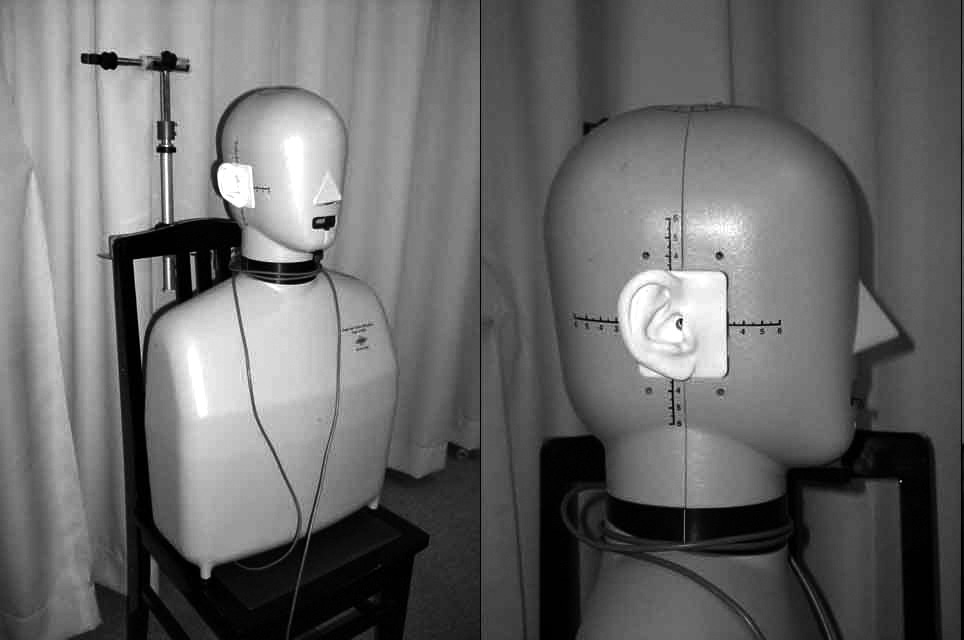
Brüel & Kjær head and torso simulator (HATS)

Designed to be used in-situ for electro-acoustic tests on, for example, telephone handsets, headsets, audio conference devices, microphones, headphones, hearing aids and hearing protectors. It includes soft moulded pinnae, nose, mouth and torso. Using an MRI scanner, Brüel & Kjær and DTU collected the geometries of a large population of human ears. By capturing the full ear canal geometry including the bony part adjoining the eardrum was, this data was post-processed to determine the average human ear canal geometry.

=== Neumann KU 100 ===
The Neumann KU 100 is a simple design, with a more abstract representation of a head, and "realistic" ears. It is not customizable. The Neumann is a commonly used binaural microphone and features use by BBC R&D teams.

=== G.R.A.S. Head & Torso Simulator KEMAR (HATS) ===
KEMAR was initially invented in collaboration with the audiological industry for the use of hearing aid development, and is still the de facto standard for this industry – however since then the usage of KEMAR has spread into a multitude of other industries like: telecommunications, hearing protection test, automotive development etc. KEMAR is designed using large statistical research to as close to the average human measurements as possible. Torso reflections have been seen to be a considerable contributor to creating a successful binaural recording. It has replaceable pinnae of different sizes and materials and sets of different type ear-canal simulators.

=== 3Dio range ===
The 3Dio range of binaural microphones feature two silicone ear (pinna) moulds separated by 14 centimetres (5.5 in)—slightly narrower than many binaural microphones. Microphones are placed inside the ears, and range from Primo EM172 in the Free Space and Free Space XLR models, to DPA 4060s in the Pro II model. The 3Dio range is considerably cheaper than the Neumann KU 100, for example, and used more on a consumer to prosumer level. There is no head mass between the ears, which allows the microphone to be lighter and more mobile, compared to other binaural microphones which can often weigh several kilograms.

=== Sound Professionals SP-TFB-2 and DPA 4560 headset microphone ===
These are both in-ear wearable stereo microphones, used like earphones, placed inside the human pinna. They use the user's pinna and head mass to create the binaural effect.

== Alternative methods of achieving binaural sound ==
Sounds that have been recorded in mono can be placed in a three-dimensional soundstage as if they had been recorded using a binaural head by using "binaural panning" software. The sound is processed using a complex mathematical algorithm imprinting inter-aural time, level, limited HRTF information, and optionally also room acoustics, onto the sound recording creating a binaural effect.

Ambisonic recording techniques can also be used to generate binaural sound recordings.

== Re-recording techniques ==
The technique of binaural re-recording is simple but has not been well established. It follows the same principles of Worldizing, a technique used by film sound designers in which sound is played over a loudspeaker in a real-world location and then re-recorded, taking along all the aspects and characteristics of the real-world environment with it. A binaural microphone is used to record content being played over a multi-channel speaker set-up. The binaural head, or microphone, is therefore theoretically making a recording of how humans will hear multi-channel content. The soundtrack to a film, for example, could be recorded by the binaural microphone with all the environmental cues of the given location, as well as reverberations.

== Known issues ==
=== Averaging ===
The main focus of recording with a binaural head is to achieve a perfect binaural playback that is suited to all listeners. The problem arises that each human head has different shaped and sized features, making it very difficult to create a binaural effect compatible for everyone's ears.

Averaging is done, either in the physical properties of binaural head microphones, or in the mathematical algorithm used to generate binaural sound using binaural panning software or ambisonic decoders. Some people may report hearing a very dramatic soundstage, while others may not.

The effect that the shape of our head and our ears has on the sound we hear is part of what is called the head-related transfer function (HRTF). Recent Apple iPhone Pro phones use the camera and LiDAR Scanner to create a 3D picture of the listener's ears, in order to create a personalized HRTF file so that their own ear shape is factored into what they hear.

=== Timbral issues ===
In January 2012 BBC R&D worked together with BBC Radio 4 to produce a binaural production of Private Peaceful. The dramatization featured a reproduction of a 5.1 speaker system, and had 4 variations. At the start of each variation, the listener would hear a series of test signals allowing for a choice of which version gives them the best spatial experience. By doing this, BBC R&D have accepted that there will be variations on the success of the binaural reproduction, and therefore provided different mixes based on different sets of HRTF data. The release of Private Peaceful had an accompanying survey which all listeners were asked to complete. It asked questions about the success that the binaural reproduction had with the listeners and which version (1–4) the listener thought was most successful.

During an interview with Chris Pike from BBC R&D in September 2012, Pike stated that "you may get good spatial impression but timbral coloration is often an issue". The issue of timbral colouration is mentioned in a large amount of spatial enhancement research and is sometimes seen as the outcome of the misuse or insufficient amount of HRTF data when reproducing binaural audio for example, or the fact that the end-user simply will not respond well to the collected HRTF data. Francis Rumsey states in the 2011 article "Whose head is it anyway?" that "badly implemented HRTFs can give rise to poor timbral quality, poor externalisation, and a host of other unwanted results". Getting the HRTF data correct is a key point in making the final product a success, and possibly by making the HRTF data as extensive as possible, there will be less room for error such as timbral issues. The HRTFs used for Private Peaceful were designed by measuring impulse responses in a reverberant room.

Juha Merimaa from Sennheiser Research Laboratories found that using HRTF filters to reduce timbral issues did not affect the spatial localization previously achieved using the data when tested on a panel of listeners. This explains that there are ways of reducing the effects of timbral issues on audio that have been processed with HRTF data, but this does mean further EQ manipulation of the audio. If this route is to be further explored, researchers will have to be happy with the fact that the audio is being manipulated in great amounts to achieve a greater sense of spatial awareness, and that this further manipulation will cause irreversible changes to the audio, something content creators may not be happy with. Consideration will have to be taken into how much manipulation is appropriate and to what extent, if any, will this affect the end users experience.

=== Issues related to headphone quality ===
Ideal listening conditions will most likely be experienced with headphones designed to give an as flat frequency response as possible in order to reduce colouration of the audio the user is listening to. But many people may only have access to low quality headphones, which can result in them hearing something very different from what was intended, and that can muddy the spatial cues in the binaural audio.

=== Loudspeaker compatibility ===
While a binaural recording can be played on a stereo loudspeaker system, the spatial cues that should only be heard by the left ear are heard by both ears, rather than only by the ear on the corresponding side, as would be the case with headphones. Likewise, with the right ear spatial cues. This means the spatial effect of the binaural sound is compromised to a degree, and in some cases can sound a little odd. It is possible to convert binaural sound into a format that sits more naturally on a stereo loudspeaker system using software, such as Logic Pro's Binaural Post Processing plug-in.

A method to convert binaural sound for loudspeaker playback

== See also ==
- Binaural beats – Interference pattern between signals of similar frequency
- Binaural fusion
- Blumlein pair – Stereo recording technique
- Dynamic Binaural recording – Type of binaural recording
- Franssen effect
- Holophonics – Binaural recording system
- Precedence effect – Psychoacoustical phenomenon
