= Arthur Haddy =

English recording engineer

Haddy in the 1970s

Arthur Charles William Haddy OBE (16 May 1906 – 18 December 1989) was an English recording engineer. His work as Technical Director of Decca Records caused him to be nicknamed "the father of hi-fi".

After working in the recording industry in the 1930s, Haddy was employed in wartime projects during the Second World War. These required new, sophisticated sonic developments that Haddy and his colleagues later put to peacetime use in Decca's innovative postwar recording techniques. He was an early proponent of the long-playing record, stereophony, video discs and digital recording.

== Biography ==
=== Early years ===
Haddy was born in Newbury, Berkshire, and educated locally at St. Bartholomew's Grammar School. He became an apprentice with the radio equipment manufacturers C. F. Elwell Ltd, and moved to the Western Electric Company as a junior employee. In 1929, he became engaged to the daughter of Harry Fay, a popular singer who recorded with the Crystalate Company, makers of the Rex and Panachord labels. Haddy attended one of Fay's recording sessions, and, as he later recalled:

I was amazed at the primitive equipment they had installed. I commented that I could build something better than that on the kitchen table. About six months later I had a call from the company's managing director asking if my remark could be taken seriously. I said that it had been meant as a joke but none the less I would have a go. I built a set of amplifiers and cutting head for them on the strength of which I was asked to join the firm.

Haddy was reluctant to leave Western Electric, but Crystalate offered him twice his existing salary, and his fiancée insisted on his accepting the offer.

Together with a music director, Jay Wilbur, Haddy was in sole charge of the technical side of the company's work until the young Kenneth Wilkinson joined him in 1931. Although the company was based at Tonbridge in Kent, Crystalate made many of its recordings at the acoustically excellent town hall of West Hampstead in north west London. At first the company rented the hall, and was later able to buy the freehold for £1,250. During the 1930s Haddy gradually developed improved cutting heads and dynamic pickups, with the aim of widening the usable frequency range of his records. At that time, recordings were cut directly on wax, and the existing cutting heads were restricted to a bandwidth of about 50-8,000Hz. After experimenting with other techniques, Haddy opted for the moving-coil principle which Paul Voigt of Edison Bell and Alan Blumlein of EMI had separately advocated back in the 1920s. His first efforts were restricted to a 7,500Hz upper limit but the sound quality was nonetheless much improved. The repertoire recorded by Haddy for Crystalate was mainly light music and comedy records, with artists such as Sandy Powell, Charles Penrose, and Leslie Sarony.

=== Decca ===
In 1937, the Decca Record Company took over Crystalate. Haddy and Wilkinson joined the Decca staff. When World War II broke out in 1939, Haddy and his team were moved from making commercial recordings to developing vital technology for the war effort. They were tasked with making recording equipment to detect the sonic differences in the water movement around German and British submarine propellers. As the relevant sonic differences were at the high end of the frequency range, unprecedently sensitive equipment had to be invented. Haddy managed to meet the requirement by doubling the response of his recording cutter head to 15,000Hz. This was not only an important contribution to the war effort, but made possible greatly enhanced gramophone recordings when the war ended. "We'd got the goods," Haddy later recalled. His exploitation of the greatly enhanced frequency range was the basis of Decca's famous "ffrr" – full frequency range recordings. So significant were his developments that his original ffrr cutting head is on permanent display in the Science Museum in London.

In the early years of ffrr, Haddy engineered many Decca recordings, but from the early 1950s onward he delegated studio work to his colleagues, including Wilkinson, Cyril Windebank, Roy Wallace, and later a new generation of engineers such as Gordon Parry. By the end of the decade Decca's technical team was recognised as the best in the industry; The Times spoke of "Decca's incomparable engineers".

Under Haddy's technical leadership, Decca was the first British company to issue long playing records (1950) and was in the vanguard of stereophony in the middle of the decade. He was also a pioneer of the video disc at the end of the 1960s, which did not succeed commercially, and of digital recording, which quickly became the industry standard. Of his work on the latter, Ivor Humphreys wrote in Gramophone:

Haddy was a keen advocate of [digital recording] from the start, noting in particular the benefits of zero tape modulation noise, the enormous signal-to-noise ratio and the fact that a copy of a digital master really is a genuine clone and not a marginally degraded copy. He was not uncritical, though, and was troubled especially by recordings in which the ambient noise of a venue is seemingly modified or all but eliminated, and he made various tests to try to quantify the effect. The accepted need now to preserve some degree of background ambient noise if a recording is to sound natural and lifelike is due in part to his concern.

When the Decca Group was taken over by Polygram in 1980, Haddy, like his old colleague Wilkinson, retired. He died at the age of 83.
