= Kenneth Wilkinson =

British audio engineer (1912–2004)

Kenneth Wilkinson (r.) with Sir Malcolm Sargent at a recording session

Kenneth Ernest Wilkinson (28 July 1912 – 13 January 2004) was an audio engineer for Decca Records, known for engineering classical recordings with superb sound quality.

After working for small recording companies, Wilkinson was taken onto the staff of Decca, where he engineered many recordings, working with producers such as John Culshaw and conductors including Sir Georg Solti, Hans Knappertsbusch and Benjamin Britten. He trained a whole generation of celebrated Decca engineers.

Wilkinson so closely identified with the Decca sound that he retired when the company was absorbed into the PolyGram group in 1980.

== Life and career ==
=== Early life ===
Wilkinson was born in London. He attended Trinity Grammar School, Wood Green in north London, on a scholarship. He left school at the age of sixteen in 1928, and worked for the publishing house Cassell's. When one of the firm's accountants left to join the World Echo Record Company, Wilkinson went with him, and was present at the company's first electrical recording at the old Clerkenwell Sessions House off Farringdon Street in London. In that job, which involved him in the early electrical recording process, he met Jay Wilbur (James Edward Wilbur), a dance bandleader who interested him in the technical side of recording. The company folded, and Wilkinson took a job in charge of the recorded music at an ice rink in Brighton.

=== Decca ===
Wilbur had joined Crystalate, another record company, and invited Wilkinson to join him at its studios in Hampstead. Wilkinson's job as a junior there included shaving waxes, removing the surface of used recording waxes to make them blank for re-recording. At Crystalate he met the recording engineer Arthur Haddy (1906–1989). When Decca acquired Crystalate in 1937, Wilkinson and Haddy (who would become the technical director at Decca) now worked for the new company.

ffrr brought Decca to the forefront of recording companies after World War II.

An attempt to volunteer for the Royal Air Force during World War II was refused because Decca was involved in top secret government research. Wilkinson would work on submarine navigation, recording Luftwaffe night fighter signals, and on navigation aspects of the dam buster operations of Barnes Wallace. With Haddy, he also worked on Decca's recording equipment, disc cutters, and recording techniques including "ffrr" (full frequency range recording). He was also involved in recording two of Decca's most popular artists: Vera Lynn and Mantovani.

Wilkinson's early recordings as an engineer were for monaural 78 rpm releases. With Charles Munch bringing the Paris Conservatoire Orchestra to record in London for the first time, Wilkinson had to find a new recording location as Kingsway Hall was already booked. He found an outstanding acoustic in Walthamstow Town Hall, which was booked for the sessions for 8–11 October 1946. For these sessions, he also served as producer. On 19 November, he was back at Walthamstow recording the London Symphony Orchestra in that venue for the first time. Victor Olof (1898–1976) was the producer for this session and many future ones with Wilkinson as engineer. Their collaboration included a complete set of Sibelius's symphonies recorded between 1952 and 1955 in Kingsway Hall.

=== LP and stereo ===
Decca was an early adopter of the LP album, which put it ahead of its direct competitor EMI. The company was also an early exponent of stereophonic recording. Wilkinson would make the move to stereo recordings for Decca in April 1958, but until then he remained the engineer with the monaural recording team (for a time there were parallel recording teams) because mono was considered the more important release. In the early 1950s, together with Roy Wallace (1927–2007) and Haddy, he developed the Decca tree spaced microphone array used for stereo orchestral recordings. Decca began to use this for recordings in May 1954 at Victoria Hall in Geneva, a venue Wilkinson did not record in. He preferred recording in London and Paris although he also recorded in Amsterdam, Bayreuth, Chicago, Copenhagen, Rome, and Vienna.

Wilkinson discussed the use of the Decca tree in an interview with Michael H. Gray in 1987.

You set up the Tree just slightly in front of the orchestra. The two outriggers, again, one in front of the first violins, that's facing the whole orchestra, and one over the cellos. We used to have two mikes on the woodwind section – they were directional mikes, 56's in the early days. You'd see a mike on the tympani, just to give it that little bit of clarity, and one behind the horns. If we had a harp, we'd have a mike trained on the harp. Basically, we never used too many microphones. I think they're using too many these days.

Wilkinson's method of selecting recording venues was recounted in an article on concert hall orchestral sound written by the conductor Denis Vaughan in 1981:

I have recorded in many halls throughout Europe and America and have found that halls built mainly of brick, wood and soft plaster, which are usually older halls, always produce a good natural warm sound. Halls built with concrete and hard plaster seem to produce a thin hard sound and always a lack of warmth and bass. Consequently when looking for halls to record in I always avoid modern concrete structures.

=== Legacy ===
Wilkinson went on to engineer at hundreds of recording sessions. He was said to have worked with more than 150 conductors. He was the engineer most responsible for Richard Itter's Lyrita recordings (which Decca produced). Itter always requested Wilkinson as engineer, calling him "a wizard with mikes".

Wilkinson's stereo recordings with the conductor Charles Gerhardt (including a series of Reader's Digest recordings and the RCA Classic Film Scores series) and the producer John Culshaw made his name and reputation known to record reviewers and audiophiles. His legacy was extended by the fact that he trained every Decca engineer from 1937 onwards.

Wilkinson, always called "Wilkie" in the music business, was known as a straight-talking man, interested only in the quality of the work. The Decca producer Ray Minshull (1934–2007) recalled Wilkinson's methods in an interview with Jonathan Valin in March 1993:

Everyone loved and respected Wilkie, but during a session he could be exacting when it came to small details. He would prowl the recording stage with a cigarette – half-ash – between his lips, making minute adjustments in the mike set-up and in the orchestral seating. Seating arrangement was really one of the keys to Wilkie's approach and he would spend a great deal of time making sure that everyone was located just where he wanted them to be, in order for the mikes to reflect the proper balances. Of course, most musicians had a natural tendency to bend toward the conductor as they played. If such movement became excessive, Wilkie would shoot out onto the stage and chew the erring musician out before reseating him properly. He wanted the musicians to stay exactly where he had put them. He was the steadiest of engineers, the most painstaking and the most imaginative. In all of his sessions, he never did the same thing twice, making small adjustments in mike placement and balances to accord with his sense of the sonic requirements of the piece being played.

Among Wilkinson's favourite recordings was Britten's War Requiem. This was recorded in January 1963 at one of Wilkinson's favourite venues, Kingsway Hall, with Culshaw as the producer. Among other recordings engineered by Wilkinson were Wagner's Parsifal recorded live at Bayreuth in 1951, of which the critic Andrew Porter wrote, "...the most moving and profound of spiritual experiences ... Decca have recorded, superbly, a superb performance", and Berlioz's Symphonie fantastique with Sir Georg Solti conducting the Chicago Symphony Orchestra in May 1972 at the University of Illinois at Urbana-Champaign's Krannert Center.

Wilkinson retired from Decca when the company was taken over by the PolyGram group in 1980. He made no free-lance recordings. His work was released on Lyrita and Reader's Digest records (as mentioned above) and RCA Records with recordings licensed through Decca. His recordings were characterised by the producer Tam Henderson in an appreciation: "The most remarkable sonic aspect of a Wilkinson orchestral recording is its rich balance, which gives full measure to the bottom octaves, and a palpable sense of the superior acoustics of the venues he favored, among them the Assembly Hall at Waltham Forest Town Hall, Walthamstow in London and The Kingsway Hall of revered memory".

Among the popular performers whom he recorded over the years were Mantovani, the Ted Heath Band, Vera Lynn, Edmundo Ros, Jo Stafford and Rosemary Squires.

== Personal life and awards ==
Wilkinson married Miriam Tombs in 1938, and they had four children (two sons, two daughters).

On retiring, Wilkinson received a special gold disc produced by Decca with extracts of his recordings. He received three Grammys for engineering: 1973, 1975, and 1978. He also received an audio award from Hi-Fi magazine in 1981 and the Walter Legge Award in 2003 "…for extraordinary contribution to the field of recording classical music".

Wilkinson died in Norwich at the age of 91.
