= Blumlein pair =

Stereo recording technique

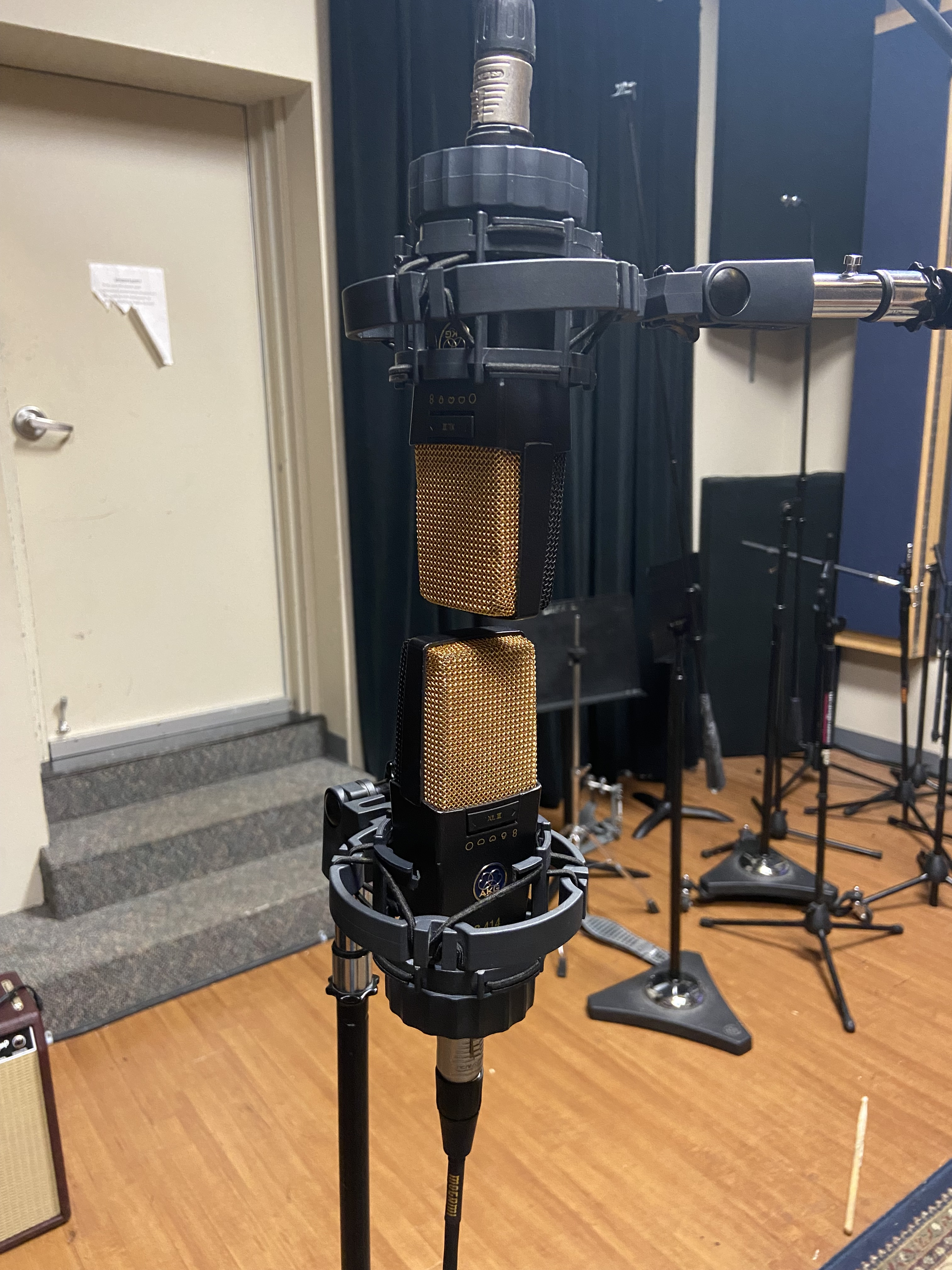
Two bi-directional AKG C414 microphones set up in a Blumlein pair

Blumlein pair is a stereo recording technique invented by Alan Blumlein for the creation of recordings that, upon replaying through headphones or loudspeakers, recreate the spatial characteristics of the recorded signal.

The pair consists of an array of two matched microphones that have a bi-directional ("figure-eight") polar pattern, positioned 90° from each other. Ideally, the transducers should occupy the same physical space; since this cannot be achieved, the microphone capsules are placed as close to each other as physically possible, generally with one centered directly above the other. The array is oriented so that the line bisecting the angle between the two microphones points towards the sound source to be recorded (see diagram). The pickup patterns of the pair, combined with their positioning, delivers a high degree of stereo separation in the source signal, as well as the room ambiance.

The Blumlein pair produces an exceptionally realistic stereo image, but the quality of recordings is highly dependent on the acoustics of the room and the size of the sound source.

Both ribbon and condenser microphones can be used for Blumlein-pair recording. A few types of stereo ribbon microphones (B & O, Royer, AEA) have even been purpose-built for just this type of recording. Several types of stereo condenser microphones (Neumann, AKG, Schoeps, Nevaton BPT) have also offered a Blumlein arrangement as one of their possible configurations. Individual microphones with variable patterns (such as those from Pearl/Milab) can be used. The Soundfield microphone used to make Ambisonic recordings can be adjusted to mimic two microphones of any pattern at any angle to each other, including a Blumlein pair.

In his early experiments at EMI with what he called "binaural" sound, Blumlein did not use this actual technique because he did not have access to figure-eight microphones. This meant that he had to develop ways of using omnidirectional microphones to record what we now know as stereo sound. In the claims he made in his U.K. patent application in 1931, as well as details of these techniques, he included the theoretical possibility of using directional microphones in what later became known as a Blumlein pair. During the period when Blumlein's patent (British Patent 394325) was being written, Harry F. Olson published a patent for the first practical ribbon microphone, and much of the later experimental work was carried out with this type of microphone

It is unclear when this approach became known as the Blumlein pair, although it does not appear to have been known by that name during his lifetime.

Bidirectional (figure-8) microphone sensitivity pattern (red dot is microphone, viewed from above)	Blumlein-pair array (2 crossed figure-8s)	Blumlein-pair array (small arrows indicate front of individual microphones, large arrow indicates front of array)

== See also ==
- ORTF stereo technique
