= Ambiophonics =

Surround sound technology

Ambiophonics is a method in the public domain that employs digital signal processing (DSP) and two loudspeakers directly in front of the listener in order to improve reproduction of stereophonic and 5.1 surround sound for music, movies, and games in home theaters, gaming PCs, workstations, or studio monitoring applications. First implemented using mechanical means in 1986, today a number of hardware and VST plug-in makers offer Ambiophonic DSP. Ambiophonics eliminates crosstalk inherent in the conventional stereo triangle speaker placement, and thereby generates a speaker-binaural soundfield that emulates headphone-binaural sound, and creates for the listener improved perception of reality of recorded auditory scenes. A second speaker pair can be added in back in order to enable 360° surround sound reproduction. Additional surround speakers may be used for hall ambience, including height, if desired.

== Ambiophonics, stereophonics, and human hearing ==
In stereophonics, the reproduced sound is distorted by crosstalk, where signals from either speaker reach not only the intended ear, but the opposite ear, causing comb filtering that distorts timbre of central voices, and creating false early reflections due to the delay of sound reaching the opposite ear. In addition, auditory images are bounded between left (L) and right (R) speakers, usually positioned at ±30° with respect to the listener, thereby including 60°, only 1/6 of the horizontal circle, with the listener at the center. Human hearing can locate sound from directions not only in a 360° circle, but a full sphere.

Ambiophonics eliminates speaker crosstalk and its deleterious effects. Using ambiophonics, auditory images can extend in theory all the way to the sides, at ±90° left and right and including the front hemi-circle of 180°, depending on listening acoustics and to what degree the recording has captured the interaural level differences (ILD) and the interaural time differences (ITD) that characterize two-eared human hearing. Most existing two-channel discs (LPs as well as CDs) include ILD and ITD data that cannot be reproduced by the stereo loudspeaker triangle due to inherent crosstalk. When reproduced using ambiophonics, such existing recordings' true qualities are revealed, with natural solo voices and wider images, up to 150° in practice.

It is also possible to make new recordings using binaurally-based main microphones, such as an ambiophone, which is optimized for Ambiophonic reproduction (stereo-compatible) since it captures and preserves the same ILD and ITD that one would experience with one's own ears at the recording session. Along with lifelike spatial qualities, more correct timbre (tone color) of sounds is preserved. Use of ORTF, Jecklin Disk, and sphere microphones without pinna (outer ear) can produce similar results. (Note that microphone techniques such as these that are binaural-based but without pinna also produce compatible results using conventional speaker-stereo, 5.1 surround, and MP3 players.)

== Roots and research ==
In 1981, Carver Corporation incorporated filtering to attempt to pre-subtract anti-crosstalk in its analogue Carver C4000 Control Console. This was called Sonic Holography.

An early hardware attempt to compensate for loudspeaker-ear crosstalk was to apply a little out-of-phase left channel to a separate driver in the right speaker cabinet, and vice versa. This was marketed in 1982 by Polk Audio as "true stereo" in its SDA-SRS, SDA1 and SDA2 series speakers by licensing the Carver Sonic Holography patent.

In 1991, Roland Corporation launched Roland Sound Space, a system that created a 3D sound space using stereo speakers.

Ambiophonics is an amalgam of new research and previously known psychoacoustic principles and binaural technologies. This knowledge has enabled audio recording and reproduction that approaches the realistic soundfield at the ears of the listener that is comparable to what one would perceive in a concert hall, movie scene, or game environment. This level of high-fidelity was not realizable until human hearing and acoustics principles were thoroughly researched, and affordable PCs with sufficient processing speed became available. At the Casa Della Musica at the University of Parma, Italy, or at the listening lab at Filmaker. Technology, Pennsylvania, US, ambiophonics, ambisonics, stereophonics, 5.1 2D surround, and hybrid full-sphere 3D systems can be compared for the abilities of these methods to convey the spatiality and tone color of real perception. Developers have provided many scientific papers and downloadable tools for implementing ambiophonics free of charge for personal use.

== Results and limitations ==
By repositioning speakers closer together to create a stereo dipole, and using digital signal processing such as free RACE (Recursive Ambiophonic Crosstalk Elimination) or similar software, ambiophonic reproduction is able to generate wide auditory images from most ordinary CDs/LPs/DVDs or MP3s of music, movies, or games and, depending upon the recording, restore the lifelike localization, spatiality, and tone color they have captured.

Additionally, ambiophonics provides for the optional use of concert-hall or other ambience impulse response convolution to generate hall ambience signals for virtually any number and any placement of surround speakers. But ambiophonics is not for theaters, auditoriums, or any large groups. Ambiophonics can usually accommodate more than one listener since one can move back and forth along the line bisecting the speakers. Precisely because of the higher level of envelopment along this line, the loss of realism when one moves away from the center line is more dramatic in the case of Ambiophonics than stereo. The listening area can be enlarged with ambience convolution, whereby surround speakers mimic the contributions of concert-hall walls.

Ambiophonics methods can be implemented in ordinary laptops, PCs, soundcards, hi-fi amplifiers, and even modest loudspeakers with consistent phase response, especially in any crossover regions. Neither true-binaural (dummy head with pinna) recordings nor head tracking are required, as with headphone-binaural listening. Commercial products now implement ambiophonics DSP, although tools for use on PCs are also available online.

== Surround sound ==
In practice in its simplest two-speaker implementation, ambiophonic reproduction unlocks auditory cues for images of up to 150° horizontally (azimuth), depending on the binaural cues captured in existing stereo recordings. Multi-channel recordings made with ambiophone-like microphone arrays to make 5.1-compatible DVD and SACD recordings can be reproduced using just four speakers (a center speaker is obviated in ambiophonic layouts). Allowing for the human hearing cone of confusion at each side, a full 360° circle of perceived sound localization has been measured within ±5° of actual source azimuth, reproducing lifelike spatial envelopment and timbre (contributed by accurate directional provenance of early reflections) of multi-channel music, movies, and game content.

Especially in the case of stereo content where ambience has been purposely reduced (because a natural level coming from front 60°-only is perceived as too much), additional signals for surround speakers can be produced using a measured hall impulse response, convolved in a PC with the two front channel signals. For full ambiophonic replay, one PC can provide the DSP for 4-channel crosstalk-cancellation and four or more (up to 16, depending on the PC) surround speakers.

== See also ==
- Soundbar
