= Panning law =

Principle in audio engineering

Panning law, or panning rule, is a recording and mixing principle that states that any signal of equal amplitude and phase that is played in both channels of a stereo system will increase in loudness up to 6.02 dBSPL, provided there is perfect response in the loudspeaker system and perfect acoustics in the room.

Often, the acoustic summing of a room and system are inferior to the ideal, so the specific relative level will increase from −3 dB to 0 dB as the mono signal is panned from center to hard left or right. The idea of including a pan law is so that when one directs signals left or right with the pan pot, the perceived loudness will stay the same.

However, both the direction of attenuation throughout the panoramic sweep and the amount by which the signal is attenuated vary according to panning rule. For example, Yamaha digital consoles employ a typical (compromise) 3 dB panning rule where the signal is at full level when pan position is centered and becomes progressively louder (up to + 3 dB) as it is panned to the right or left.

The 3 dB panning rule is a commonly applied compromise to comply with the mediocre acoustic summing capabilities of most control rooms. However, the console manufacturer SSL used to employ a 4.5 dB panning rule, because it was believed that their expensive consoles would normally be used in tuned rooms that had acoustic summing capabilities closer to the ideal.

Many consoles that have only one panning rule employ one such that a signal panned hard left or right is at full level and becomes progressively lower in level as the pan is directed to the center.

== See also ==
- Phantom center
- Stereo imaging
