= Phantom center =

Psycho-acoustic phenomenon

Phantom center refers to the psycho-acoustic phenomenon of a sound source appearing to emanate from a point between two speakers in a stereo configuration. When the same sound arrives at both ears at the same time with the same intensity, it appears to originate from a point in the center of the two speakers.

A difference in intensity (volume) will cause the sound to appear to come from the louder side. Similarly, if a sound arrives at one ear before the other (no later than approximately 30 ms, see Precedence effect), it will appear to originate from that side. The ear–brain system evolved to use these cues to determine the location of sounds, an important evolutionary advantage.

Frequency variations can also affect perceived directivity of sound. Therefore, the tightness of the stereo field (and hence phantom center image) is highly dependent on the frequency response of the speakers producing it being matched as closely as possible.

These psycho-acoustic properties can be used to artificially place sounds within a stereo field, as is done in stereo mixing, most frequently with the use of panning. In surround sound, vocals are often mapped to a dedicated center channel, eliminating the need to create a phantom center using the left and right channels.

== See also ==
- Pan law
- Stereo imaging
