= Stereo dipole =

A stereo dipole is a sound source in an Ambiophonic system, made by two closely spaced loudspeakers that ideally span 10 to 30 degrees. Thanks to the cross-talk cancellation method, a stereo dipole can render an acoustic stereo image nearly 180 degrees wide (single stereo dipole) or 360 degrees (dual or double stereo dipole).
