= Stereo image =

Stereo image may refer to:

- Stereogram, an image intended to give a 3-dimensional visual impression
- The impression of localization of sound source in stereo imaging
