= Apparent source width =

Audible impression of a spatially extended sound source

Apparent source width (ASW) refers to the perceived spatial extent of a sound source. This psychoacoustic phenomenon is influenced by both the sound radiation pattern of the source itself and the acoustic properties of the environment in which it is located. A wide ASW is often a desirable characteristic, particularly in genres like classical music, opera, and historically informed performance, as it is associated with the immersive sound of acoustic spaces. The study of ASW draws upon research from various fields, including room acoustics, architectural acoustics, auralization, musical acoustics, psychoacoustics, and systematic musicology.

== Physics and perception ==
Apparent source width is the aurally perceived extent of a sound source. Sometimes, it is defined as the impression that a source sounds larger than its visible size. The impression results from several auditory cues, which are affected by the sound radiation characteristics of the source itself and by characteristics of the room. Since the term apparent source width has been used a lot in the field of subjective room acoustics to characterize how the room affects the perception of source size, the term perceived source extent has been introduced to highlight that the perception results from both the sound source and the room.

The auditory system has mechanisms that separate the processing of late reverberation from the processing of direct sound and early reflections, which is referred to as the precedence effect. While the late reverberation contributes to the perception of listener envelopment and reverberance, the direct sound and the early reflections mostly affect source localization, intimacy and the apparent source width. The balance of early and late arriving sound affects the perceived clarity, warmth and brilliance.

The auditory system does not process all early sounds together to derive a source location. In complicated acoustical scenes, the auditory system integrates those parts of sound that share temporal, spectral, and spatial properties into one so-called auditory stream. An auditory stream is the counterpart to a visible object in Gestalt psychology. Several auditory streams are segregated from one another. The process of integration and segregation is referred to as auditory scene analysis, and is believed to be the original function of the ear. Each auditory stream can have its own apparent source width. One auditory stream may contain the direct sound and early reflections of a single musical instrument or a musical ensemble.

A high strength of low frequencies and incoherence of the left and the right ear of one auditory stream, especially of its direct sound and early reflections, increase the apparent source width. Even in the absence of room acoustical reflections, the pure direct sound of musical instruments already affects the perceived source extent. Unlike a theoretical monopole source, musical instruments do not radiate their sound evenly in all directions. Rather, the overall volume and the frequency spectrum differ in each direction. This is referred to as sound radiation characteristics or radiation patterns. These may create incoherent signals at the ears and, consequently, the impression of a wide source. The sound radiation characteristics of musical instruments are typically given as a radiation pattern in a two- or three-dimensional polar coordinate system.

== Subjective room acoustics ==
The apparent source width and other subjective sound properties in many concert halls have been rated by experts, including conductors and music critics. Together, apparent source width and listener envelopment are the most important contributors to the spaciousness impression of a concert hall, which is the most important contributor to the quality ratings of concert halls.

In the field of subjective room acoustics, the sound radiation characteristics are ignored and the apparent source width is explained by means of objective measures of room impulse responses, like the binaural quality index, the lateral energy fraction and the early sound strength. These tend to correlate with the subjective expert ratings. Accordingly, early, incoherent, lateral reflections, together with a high loudness of low frequencies in the early reflections of the room reverberation, increase the apparent source width and thus the overall spaciousness and quality of a concert hall. This knowledge is used in architectural acoustics to design concert halls that exhibit the desired acoustical properties.

== Music production ==
In audio mastering and sound recording and reproduction, a major task of the audio engineers and record producers is to make musical instruments sound huge. The increase of apparent source width is as important as spectral balancing and dynamic range compression.

This can be achieved with established recording techniques, like A-B technique, Blumlein pair, M-S technique, and the ORTF stereo technique, or by experimenting with different types of microphones and microphone locations.

Signals that sound too narrow — like too coherent stereo recordings, monophonic recordings or synthetic sounds — can be widened by so-called pseudostereophony. These techniques decorrelate the stereo channels by applying individual audio filters, reverberation or delay effects to each. The resulting channels' signals are similar enough to be heard as one integrated auditory sound object, but are so diverse that they do not seem to originate from a tiny point source but rather from a broad source. Such techniques were also used in Duophonic sound to re-release monophonic recordings with pseudo-stereophonic sound.

== Related sound impressions ==
Several subjective sound impressions are closely related to apparent source width. Reverberance refers to the impression that spatially and temporally distributed sounds blend due to reverberation. Liveness is the impression that the room contributes more than just repetitions of direct sound. A live concert sounds better in a reverberant hall than in a dead or dry hall. In intimate halls, instruments sound close to the listener and the hall sounds small. Listener envelopment is the impression that the listener is bathed in sound, i.e., that the sound comes from all directions. Spaciousness is a term that summarizes apparent source width and listener envelopment.
