= NOS stereo technique =

Microphone technique used to record stereo sound

A diagram of the NOS stereo technique

The Nederlandse Omroep Stichting (NOS) stereo technique is a method of capturing stereo sound.

The Nederlandse Omroep Stichting (English: Dutch Broadcast Foundation) found a stereo main microphone system by a number of practical attempts in the 1960s. This system resulted in a quite even distribution of the phantom sources (hearing event direction) on the stereo loudspeaker base, with two small cardioid characteristic microphones, and a recording angle of the microphone system of ±40.5° = 81°. This system got empirical an axle angle of α = ±45° = 90° and a microphone distance (microphone basis) of a = 30 cm.

With this system are frequency-independent level differences effective and time of arrival differences working together in the same direction as interchannel signals (interchannel loudspeaker signals). This technique leads to a realistic stereo effect and has a reasonable mono-compatibility. These interchannel differences have nothing to do with interaural differences which come only from artificial head recordings. Even the spacing of a = 30 cm has nothing to do with human ear distance, because a useful microphone system for a set of stereo loudspeakers should be developed and not for ear phones. This recording technology is called mixed stereo or equivalence stereo. Usually this special microphone system must be built up from two single small diaphragm microphones. One should not use double diaphragm microphones because of the produced unbalanced directional characteristics and the larger phase responses. It appears advisable to experiment with the two parameters the axle angle α and the microphone basis a to which there are practical microphone mounting devices.

A similar technique is known as the ORTF stereo technique, devised by the French ORTF. With this technique is the angle between the microphone axes α = ± 55° = 110° and the distance between the cardioid microphones (microphone basis) is in this case a = 17 cm and gives a total recording angle of 96°. The choice between one and the other depends on the recording angle of the microphone system and not on the distance to and the width of the sound source, the orchestra angle.

== See also ==
- Blumlein pair, 90° figure-of-eight
- ORTF stereo technique, 2 cardioids
