= Phase Linear =

Defunct pro audio manufacturer mainly known for its power amps

- Founded: 1970
- Founder: Bob Carver
- Headquarters: Snohomish County, WA
- Area served: United States
- Products: Phase Linear 700 Amplifier, Phase Linear 350 Amplifier, C4000 Preamp

Phase Linear was an audio equipment manufacturer founded by Bob Carver and Steve Johnston in 1970. While primarily known as a power amplifier company it also produced several innovative preamplifiers, tuners and the Andromeda loudspeaker.

== History ==
Its first location was 19555 23rd Ave. N.W. Seattle, Washington. Its second location was a small building at 405 Howell Way in Edmonds, Washington.

The first amplifier produced was the Phase Linear 700. With 350 watts per channel it soon became the standard amplifier used by recording studios, sound reinforcement companies, professional musicians and audiophiles. It had a retail price of $749.00, or a little more than a dollar a watt. The design was notable for its brushed aluminum front panel and large dual VU meters, and was made possible by the new high-power transistors designed for the high voltages of auto electronic ignitions. That original amp was replaced by the 700B and the 700 II. All of those designs were made to have extra power to run loudly the relatively inefficient sealed-box speakers like the Acoustic Research AR3/AR3a.

The second amplifier released was the Phase Linear 400 with 200 watts per channel. It shared the same distinctive brushed aluminum, dual VU meters front panel style as the 700. It retailed for just under $500. The next product was the Phase Linear 4000 Series Auto-correlation Pre-Amplifier introduced in 1973 and manufactured through 1978. It retailed for $700.00 at the end of its life. It was a design collaboration by Bob Carver and Bill Skinner.

The company was known for the most powerful audio amplifiers of the era led by the Phase Linear D-500 introduced in 1978. It was a stereo power amplifier delivering 505 watts of clean (typically < 0.1% total harmonic distortion over 20 Hz–20 kHz) RMS power per channel. It had a retail price of $1395.

Buyout

The company was bought by Pioneer Electronics, and Bob Carver founded Carver Corporation in 1979. Pioneer added a high end cassette-tape deck designed in house and CD players designed by Kyocera to the Phase Linear line. By that time the company was in decline due to the increasing cost of research and development, and the departure of Carver. In 1982 Phase Linear was sold to Jensen Inc. which also owned the AR and Advent brands. Recoton later acquired the Jensen brands. Bob Carver went on to form Carver Corporation. He later had a falling out with Carver Corporation management and left to start Sunfire.

There continues to be a loyal following of some of the older products. Many electronic parts are still available for repairs. Mechanical parts such as switches, meters and hardware are scarce.
