= Stereo imaging =

Stereo imaging refers to the aspect of sound recording and reproduction of stereophonic sound concerning the perceived spatial locations of the sound source(s), both laterally and in depth. An image is considered to be good if the location of the performers can be clearly identified; the image is considered to be poor if the location of the performers is difficult to locate. A well-made stereo recording, properly reproduced, can provide good imaging within the front quadrant.

More complex recording and reproduction systems such as surround sound and Ambisonics can offer good imaging all around the listener and even including height information. Imaging is usually thought of in the context of recording with two or more channels, though single-channel recording may convey depth information convincingly.

== See also ==
- Pan law
- Panning (audio)
- Phantom center
