= Bob Carver =

American designer of audio equipment

Robert W. (Bob) Carver is an American designer of audio equipment based in the Pacific Northwest.

Educated as a physicist and engineer, he found an interest in audio equipment at a young age. He applied his talent to produce numerous innovative high fidelity designs since the 1970s. He is known for designing the Phase Linear 700, at 350 W per channel the most powerful consumer audio amplifier available in 1972. He went on to found the Carver Corporation in 1979, Sunfire in 1994, and the Bob Carver LLC in 2011 which was sold to Jade Design in June, 2013. However, in December 2013, Bob Carver and Jade Design parted ways.

== Amplifier modeling ==
Carver caused a stir in the industry in the mid-1980s when he challenged two high-end audio magazines to give him any audio amplifier at any price, and he'd duplicate its sound in one of his lower cost (and usually much more powerful) designs. Two magazines accepted the challenge.

First, The Audio Critic chose a Mark Levinson ML-2 which Bob acoustically copied (transfer function duplication) and sold as his M1.5t amplifier (the “t” stood for transfer function modified).

In 1985, Stereophile magazine challenged Bob to copy a Conrad-Johnson Premier Four (the make and model was not named then, but revealed later) amplifier at their offices in New Mexico within 48 hours. The Conrad Johnson amplifiers were one of the most highly regarded amplifiers of the day, costing in excess of $6,000 a pair.

In both cases, the challenging amplifier could only be treated as a “black box” and could not even have its lid removed. Nevertheless, Carver, used null difference testing, (null difference testing consists of driving two different amplifiers with identical signal sources and exact levels, but out of phase by exactly 180 degrees. If the amplifiers were 100% identical, no sound would be heard. If sound was heard, the audio amps had different properties). Bob Carver used "distortion pots" to introduce amplifier characteristics, fine-tuned to null-out any sound differences. His modified amplifier sound was so similar, Stereophile Magazine editors could not tell the difference between his amplifier and one costing more than $6,000. This amplifier was marketed as the M1.0t for about $400.00. Carver successfully copied the sound of the target amplifier and won the challenge. The Stereophile employees failed to tell the difference in their own listening room. He marketed “t” versions of his amplifiers incorporating the sound of the Mark Levinson and Conrad Johnson designs which caused him some criticism. In light of this criticism, Carver went on to design the Silver Seven, the most expensive and esoteric conventional amplifier up to that time and duplicated its sound in his M 4.0t and later models which sold for some 1/40th the price (around $600–$1500).

This also started Carver's departure from the M-series amplifier to the more robust and current-pushing TFM series amplifiers. The TFM amplifiers were designed specifically to drive the demanding load of the Amazing ribbon loudspeakers. The apex of Carver's amplifier line was the Lightstar, which is now a collector's item. Only approximately 100 of the amplifiers were made. The original Lightstar amplifier, called the Lightstar Reference, featured a dual-monoblock design, with separate power cords for each channel. A later version, called the Lightstar 2.0, featured one power cord and other cost-saving measures to shave approximately $1800 off the retail price. The two are reported to be sonically identical.

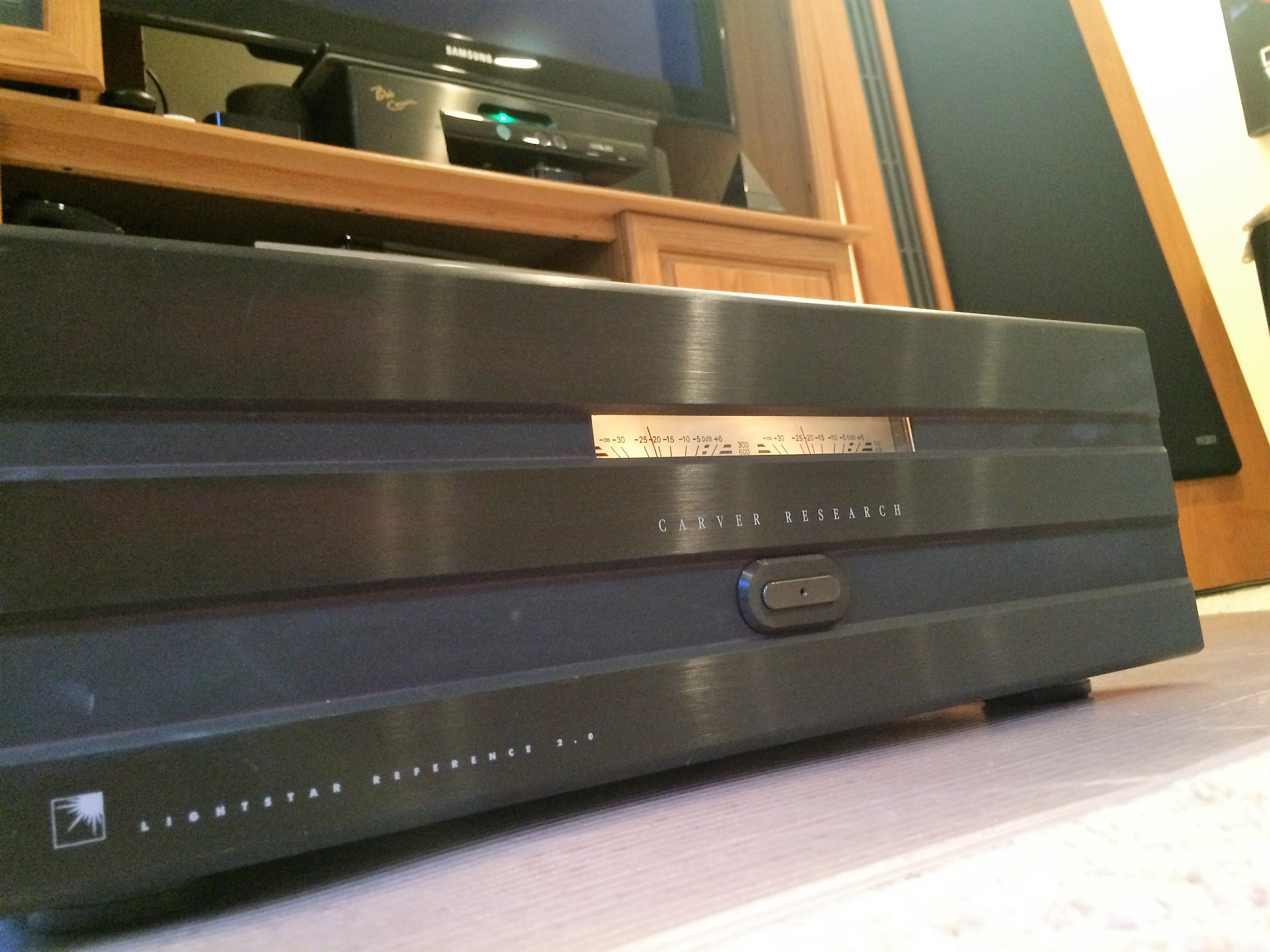
Rare Carver Research Lightstar 2.0 (100 produced)

Carver also later sued Stereophile magazine for its alleged bias against Carver products. (Stereophile had first filed suit against Carver for reprinting the magazine's copyrighted material without authorization.) The case was arbitrated with neither side awarded damages.

== Product naming ==
Carver has used some names in marketing which have other technical definitions:

- The "auto-correlator" is a multi-band, single-ended dynamic noise filter, as described in U.S. patent 3,989,897. The Phase Linear 1000 audio processor, and the Model 4000 preamplifier, which incorporate the same circuitry, have noise reduction in four frequency bands, one in the bass intended to suppress turntable rumble and three in the treble intended to suppress tape hiss and such. The noise filters are controlled by signals derived from bandpass filters, not from a correlation process. Correlation is the comparison of two or more signals, while auto-correlation is the comparison of a signal with delayed versions of itself to determine the degree of similarity at different delay times — useful, for example, to determine the amount of delay that produced an echo.
- "Magnetic field coil power amplifier" — audio amplifiers of the vacuum-tube era used transformers, incorporating coils of wire, to convert the high-voltage, low-current output of the output tubes to a low-voltage, high-current output suitable for loudspeakers. Output transformers are no longer necessary with amplifiers, including Carver's, that use transistors. Carver's U.S. patent 4,218,660, first applied in his model M400 power amplifier, describes a power supply whose input switches on and off at an ultrasonic rate to adapt to the varying power demand of the amplifier. The innovation is in the power supply, not the amplification circuitry, and in the use of switching, not in the use of a coil or coils.
- "Sonic holography", as described in U.S. patent 4,218,585 was first incorporated in the Carver C4000 preamplifier. It enhances stereo imaging by introducing a delayed and equalized signal from the right channel at the left loudspeaker to cancel the signal from the right loudspeaker at the listener's left ear (and vice versa).
- The "asymmetrical charge-coupled detector" is not the FM detector circuit of tuners, but rather, as described in U.S. patent 4,457,012, it is single-ended dynamic noise-reduction processing applied to the noisy left-minus-right component of a weak FM-stereo signal, along with artificial ambiance generation to compensate for loss of ambiance resulting from the noise reduction. This innovation was introduced in the Carver TX-1-11 component FM stereo tuner noise reduction unit and the Carver TX-11 AM/FM Stereo Tuner in 1982.

== Pictures ==
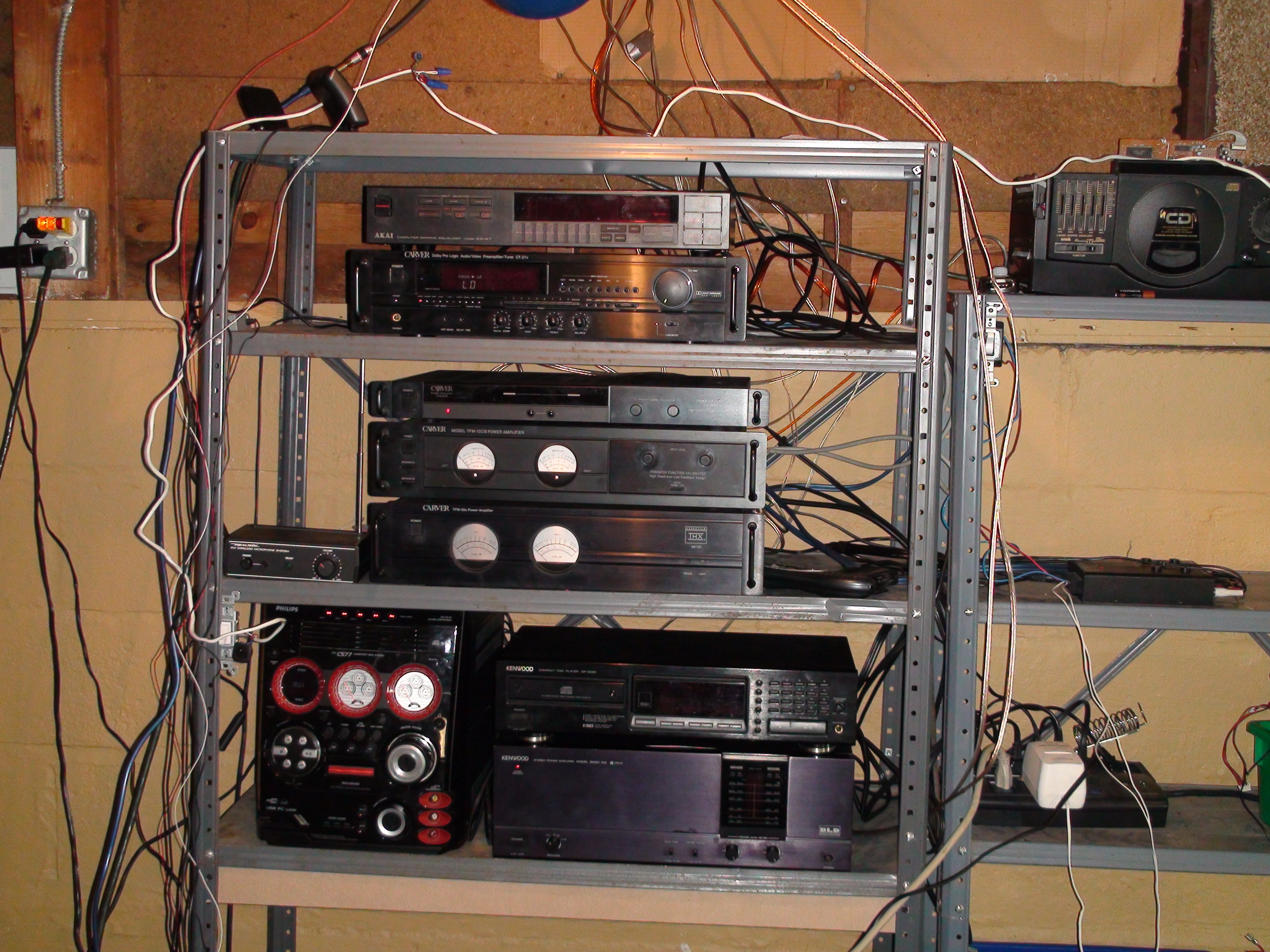
Carver TFM-6cb, TFM-15CB, TFM-55x, CT-27v

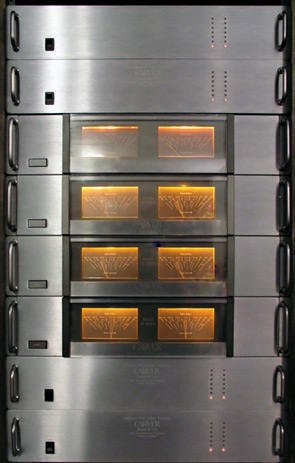
Carver M-500t and M-1.0t mk II modified
