= Jecklin disk =

Microphone placement technique utilising a sound-absorbing disk

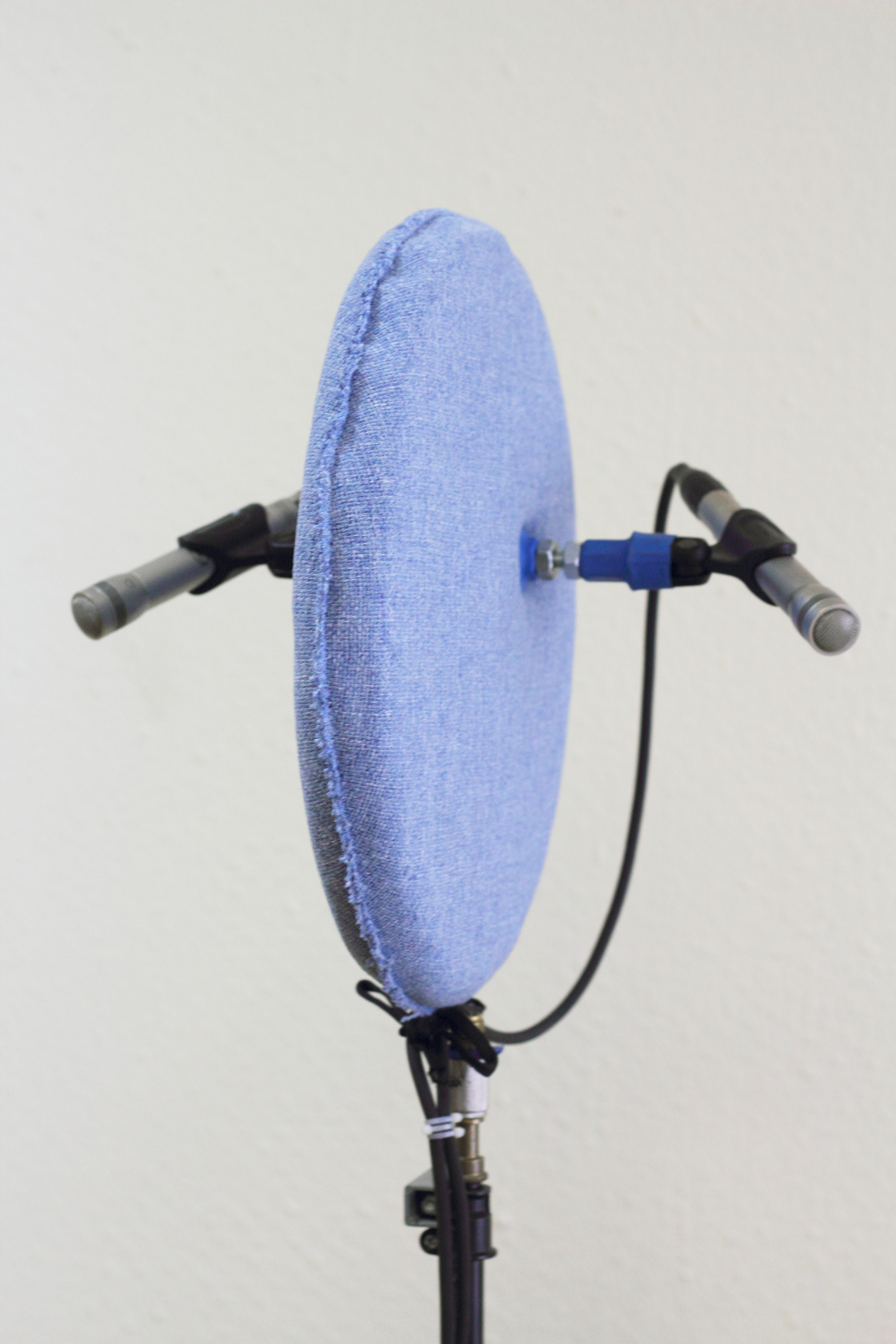
Jecklin Disk

A Jecklin disk is a sound-absorbing disk placed between two microphones to create an acoustic "shadow" from one microphone to the other. The resulting two signals can produce a pleasing stereo effect on headphones and loudspeakers but are sometimes not fully mono-compatible. A matching pair of small-diaphragm omnidirectional microphones is generally used for this technique, although it is possible to use other kinds of microphones resulting in more subtle effects.

This technique was invented by Jürg Jecklin, the former chief sound engineer of Swiss Radio and teacher at the University for Music and Performing Arts in Vienna. He referred to the technique as an "Optimal Stereo Signal" (OSS).

It is a refinement of the baffled microphone technique for stereo initially described by Alan Blumlein in his 1931 patent on binaural sound.

In the beginning Jecklin used omnidirectional microphones on either side of a 30 cm (0.98 ft) disk about 2 cm (3/4 in) thick, which had a muffling layer of soft plastic foam or wool fleece on each side. The capsules of the microphones were above the surface of the disc, just in the center, 16.5 cm (6 1/2 in) apart from each other and each pointing 20 degrees outside. Jecklin later found the 16.5 cm (6 1/2 in) ear spacing between the microphones too narrow. In his own paper, he notes that the disk has to be 35 cm (13 3/4 in) in diameter and the distance between the microphones should be 36 cm (14 3/16 in).

Jecklin's German from his script: "Zwei Kugelmikrofone sind mit einem gegenseitigen Abstand von 36 cm angeordnet und durch eine mit Schaumstoff belegte Scheibe von 35 cm Durchmesser akustisch getrennt."

The effect of the baffle is to introduce some of the frequency-response, time and amplitude variations human listeners experience as positioning cues, but in such a way that the recording also produces a useful stereo image through loudspeakers. This is sometimes known as "the Jecklin effect". There is currently no known software that can emulate this effect convincingly.

There are multiple variations of this technique, with "discs" of varying sizes and shapes, all of which work to some degree in helping to create a recording with a more believable stereo "image" than a spaced pair of microphones, but the size of the barrier is critically related to the lowest frequency at which it operates. A barrier which is too small will start operating at frequencies which are above the region of the spectrum where human hearing is most sensitive.

In contrast, traditional binaural recordings made using a mannequin head or on-ear microphones work very well when played back over headphones, especially when combined with HRTF correction, but are not as convincing and can actually sound quite unpleasant when played back through speakers.
