= ORTF stereo technique =

Microphone technique used to record stereo sound

ORTF setup

The ORTF stereo technique, also known as side-other-side, is a microphone technique used to record stereo sound. It was devised around 1960 at the now-defunct Office de Radiodiffusion Télévision Française (ORTF).

This technique combines both the volume difference and the timing difference as sound arrives on- and off-axis at two cardioid microphones spread to a 110° angle, and spaced 17 cm apart.

The microphones should be as similar as possible, preferably a frequency-matched pair of an identical type and model.

The result is a realistic stereo field that has reasonable compatibility with mono playback. Since the cardioid polar pattern rejects off-axis sound, less of the ambient room characteristic is picked up. This means the mics can be placed further away from the sound sources, resulting in a blend that may be more appealing. Furthermore, the availability of purpose-built microphone mounts makes ORTF easy to achieve.

As with all microphone arrangements, the spacing and angle can be manually adjusted slightly by ear for the best sound, which may vary depending on room acoustics, source characteristics, and other factors. This arrangement is defined as it is because it was the outcome of considerable research and experimentation, and its results are predictable and repeatable.

These interchannel differences are not the same as interaural differences, as produced by artificial head recordings. Even the spacing of 17 cm is not strictly based on interaural ear spacing. The recording angle for this microphone system is ±48° = 96°.

== See also ==
- Jecklin disk
- NOS stereo technique
