= Panning (audio) =

Distribution of an audio signal into a multi-channel sound field

Panning is the distribution of an audio signal (either monaural or stereophonic pairs) into a new stereo or multi-channel sound field determined by a pan control setting. A typical recording console has a pan control for each incoming source channel. A pan control or pan pot (shorthand for panoramic potentiometer), is a control with a position indicator that can range continuously from the 7 o'clock when fully left to the 5 o'clock position fully right. Audio mixing software replaces pan pots with on-screen virtual knobs or sliders which function like their physical counterparts.

== Overview ==
Pan pots split audio signals into left and right channels via an internal architecture that determines how much of the source signal is sent to the left and right buses. This signal distribution is often called a taper or pan law.

When centered (at 12 o'clock), the signal is sent equally to each bus. If the two output buses are later recombined into a monaural signal, then a pan law of −6 dB is desirable. If the two output buses are to remain stereo then a law of −3 dB is desirable. A law of −4.5 dB at center is a compromise between the two. A pan control fully rotated to one side results in the source being sent at full strength (0 dB) to one bus (either the left or right channel) and zero strength (−∞ dB) to the other. Regardless of the pan setting, the overall sound power level remains approximately constant. Because of the phantom center phenomenon, sound panned to the center position is perceived as coming from between the left and right speakers.

Panning in audio borrows its name from panning action in moving image technology; the term panning is derived from panorama. An audio pan pot can be used in a mix to create the impression that a source is moving from one side of the soundstage to the other, although ideally there would be timing (including phase and Doppler effects), filtering and reverberation differences present for a more complete picture of apparent movement within a defined space. Simple analog pan controls only change relative level; they don't add reverb to replace direct signal, phase changes, modify the spectrum, or change delay timing.

Panning can also be used in an audio mixer to reduce or reverse the stereo width of a stereo signal. For instance, the left and right channels of a stereo source can be panned straight up, which is sent equally to both the left output and the right output of the mixer, creating a dual mono signal.

An early panning process was used in the development of Fantasound, an early pioneering stereophonic sound reproduction system for Fantasia (1940).

== Stereo-switching ==
Before pan pots were available, "a three-way switch was used to assign the track to the left output, right output, or both (the center)". Ubiquitous in the Billboard charts throughout the middle and late 1960s, clear examples include the Beatles's "Strawberry Fields Forever" and Jimi Hendrix's "Purple Haze", Stevie Wonder's "Living for the City". In the Beatles's "A Day In The Life" Lennon's vocals are switched to the extreme right on the first two strophes, on the third strophe they are switched center then extreme left, and switched left on the final strophe while during the bridge McCartney's vocals are switched extreme right.

== See also ==
- Pan law
- Balance
