= QSound =

Sound processing algorithm

- Product type: Audio processing
- Current owner: QSound Labs
- Markets: Worldwide

QSound is the original name for a positional three-dimensional (3D) sound processing algorithm made by QSound Labs that creates 3D audio effects from multiple monophonic sources and sums the outputs to two channels for presentation over regular stereo speakers.

QSound was eventually re-dubbed "Q1" after the introduction of "Q2", a positional 3D algorithm for headphones. When multi-speaker surround system support was later added to the positional 3D process, the QSound positional 3D audio process became known simply as "Q3D".

== Technology ==
QSound is essentially a filtering algorithm. It manipulates timing, amplitude, and frequency response to produce a binaural image. Systems like QSound rely on the fact that a sound arriving from one side of the listener will reach one ear before the other and that when it reaches the furthest ear, it is lower in amplitude and spectrally altered due to obstruction by the head. However, the ideal algorithm was arrived at empirically, with parameters adjusted according to the outcomes of many listening tests.

3D positional processing like QSound, the multi-channel QSystem professional processor used in the production of pop music and film audio, is distinct from stereo expansion like QSound QXpander or SRS Sound Retrieval System. Positional 3D audio processing is a producer-side technology. It is applied to individual instruments or sound effects, and is therefore only usable at the mixing phase of music and soundtrack production, or under realtime control of game audio mixing software. Stereo expansion (processing of recorded channels and background ambience) is primarily a playback process that can be arbitrarily applied to stereo content in the end-user environment using analog integrated circuits or digital signal processing (DSP) routines.

== Adoption ==
The system was used in all Capcom CP System Dash and CP System II titles as well as the Sony ZN-1 and ZN-2 hardware arcade games such as Battle Arena Toshinden 2. Electronic Arts, Activision, Microsoft Game Studios, Sega, Virgin Interactive, TDK Mediactive, Bullfrog Productions, and Lionhead Studios have also used the technology, mostly through the use of the QMixer software development kit to implement audio positioning, mixing and control directly in the game software. In the case of Sega, it first made use of the technology starting with the Sega CD version of Ecco the Dolphin in 1993, and then later expanded its use into the Sega Saturn and Dreamcast libraries. Later versions of QMixer added support for 3D-accelerated hardware through the low-level Microsoft DirectSound3D Application Programming Interface.

Games utilizing QSound for home consoles typically had QSound mixing baked right into the audio files as Red Book Audio CD tracks using the Mixed Mode CD format or other various streaming audio formats such as XA audio or even ADPCM streaming tracks, as they lacked any dedicated hardware chips to perform real-time control of QSound effects. These games do not make use of the QMixer SDK to provide real-time QSound audio mixing and control within the game software.

While the system is known by some for its use in video game titles, the first QSound chip used for that purpose was not created until 1991; QSound had been developed in the late 1980s and has been used in everything from screensavers to television programming. QSound was also utilized on several music albums, including Madonna's 1990 album The Immaculate Collection, Sting's 1991 album The Soul Cages, Luther Vandross's 1991 album Power of Love, Paula Abdul's 1991 album Spellbound, and Roger Waters's 1992 album Amused To Death. Some TVs were also produced with this technology. Q3D has also been incorporated in a variety of computer sound cards and sound card drivers.

In 2003, Q3D was added to the list of components in QSound Labs' microQ, a small-footprint, performance-optimized software digital audio engine aimed at the mobile market (i.e. cellphones and the like). It enables 3D sound for handheld gaming and can be controlled in Java games via the JSR-234 application programming interface. Q3D was also available for general home use with QSound Labs' UltraQ, a hardware device that allows for the connection of various mono and stereo devices to provide surround sound-like effects with QSound 3D positional audio capabilities.

== Selected games using QSound ==
(NOTE: Unless otherwise stated, most arcade games on this list run on the CP System II (CPS-2) arcade system.)

Various arcade and home console games from the 1990s and early 2000s feature QSound processing. Notable games include:

- 1944: The Loop Master (Capcom)
- 19XX: The War Against Destiny (Capcom)
- Cyberbots: Full Metal Madness (Capcom)
- D2 (Sega) - Dreamcast
- Darkstalkers/Vampire series (Capcom)
- Dungeons & Dragons: Tower of Doom and Dungeons & Dragons: Shadow over Mystara (Capcom)
- Eco Fighters (Capcom)
- Ecco the Dolphin (Sega CD version) (Sega)
- Marvel vs. Capcom: Clash of Super Heroes (Capcom)
- Marvel Super Heroes (Capcom)
- Marvel Super Heroes vs. Street Fighter (Capcom)
- Mega Man: The Power Battle and Mega Man 2: The Power Fighters (Capcom)
- NiGHTS into Dreams... (Sega) - Sega Saturn
- Sonic Adventure (Sega) - Dreamcast
- Sonic CD (Sega) - Sega CD
- Sonic R (Sega) - Sega Saturn
- Starship Titanic (Digital Village)
- Street Fighter Alpha/Street Fighter Zero series (Capcom)
- Street Fighter EX and Street Fighter EX2 (Arika/Capcom) - Sony ZN-1 & ZN-2
- Super Gem Fighter Mini Mix/Pocket Fighter (Capcom)
- Super Puzzle Fighter II Turbo (Capcom)
- Super Street Fighter II (and all variations) (Capcom)
- The Punisher (Capcom) - CP System Dash
- The Terminator (Virgin) - Sega CD
- Tetris: The Grand Master (Arika/Capcom) - Sony ZN-2
- X-Men: Children of the Atom (Capcom)
- X-Men vs. Street Fighter (Capcom)
- Zork Nemesis (Activision)

== Selected albums "mixed in QSound" ==
Over 60 albums feature QSound processing. Some notable examples include:

- The Immaculate Collection by Madonna (1990)
- Power of Love by Luther Vandross (1991)
- Prisoners in Paradise by Europe (1991)
- The Soul Cages by Sting (1991)
- Spellbound by Paula Abdul (1991)
- Help Yourself by Julian Lennon (1991)
- Parallels by Fates Warning (1991)
- Dangerous by Michael Jackson (1991)
- Amused to Death by Roger Waters (1992)
- Whaler by Sophie B. Hawkins (1994)
- A Live One by Phish (1995)
- Pulse by Pink Floyd (1995)
- 18 Til I Die by Bryan Adams (1996)
- Broken China by Rick Wright (1996)

== Selected films "mixed in QSound" ==
- Robin Hood: Prince of Thieves (1991)
- Pulse by Pink Floyd (1995)

== Awards ==
QSound won Electronic Entertainment's 1993 "Most Promising" award; the editors called it the "hottest new audio technology around".

== See also ==
- Aureal Semiconductor
- Creative Technology
- GameCODA
- Head-related transfer function
- Sensaura
- Sound Retrieval System
