= QSound Labs =

Canadian audio technology company

- Traded as: Nasdaq: QSND
- Industry: Audio Technology
- Founded: 1986; 40 years ago
- Founder: Danny Lowe; John Lees; Larry Ryckman
- Defunct: February 15, 2015
- Fate: Inactive, QSND delisted, Defunct.
- Headquarters: Calgary, Alberta, Canada
- Key people: Larry Ryckman, CEO
- Products: iQFX; QSound; QSound iQ; QSystem
- Brands: microQ QHD QSurround Q3D Interactive
- Revenue: US$ 1,543,240 (2005); ▲US$ 1,989,030 (2006); ▲US$ 2,379,139 (2007)
- Total assets: US$ 2,626,663 (2006); ▲US$ 3,534,885 (2007)
- Website: www.qsound.com

QSound Labs is an audio technology company based in Calgary, Canada. It is primarily a developer and provider of audio enhancement technologies for entertainment and communications devices and software. The company is best known as a pioneer of 3D audio effects, beginning with speaker-targeted positional 3D technology applied to arcade video games and professional music and film soundtrack production. QSound was founded by Larry Ryckman (CEO), Danny Lowe, and John Lees. Jimmy Iovine served as SVP of Music and Shelly Yakus as VP of Audio Engineering in its formative years.

== History ==
The flagship technology first known simply as "QSound" saw its initial commercial application in the early 1990s, notably in Capcom arcade games and on many music releases by prominent artists. The first two QSound album titles were Sting's The Soul Cages and Madonna's The Immaculate Collection.

From the original speaker-targeted QSound 3D process used in producer-side applications, QSound Labs developed a suite of positional and enhancement spatial audio technologies, including positional audio for stereo speakers, multi-channel speaker systems and stereo earphones; stereo expansion, and virtual surround, under several technology names. There is no longer any single process now referred to as "QSound."

Although the hardware QSystem professional mixing processors and plug-in producer-side software tools were significant product offerings in the 1990s, most QSound technology is now incorporated in end-user products (such as video game software, computer sound cards and home entertainment electronics) by means of analog integrated circuits, digital signal processor (DSP) software libraries, host processor software and the like. QSound's iQ software internet audio enhancement software, their first downloadable, stand-alone consumer product, ultimately spawned a successful product line including the iQFX series of plug-ins for RealNetwork's RealPlayer.

In addition to spatial audio processing, the company has broadened its product line to include a long list of audio effects and controls such as static equalization, adaptive spectral enhancement, dynamic range controls, reverberation, and many other standard audio effects.

In 2003, QSound added a software MIDI wavetable ringtone synthesizer to its line-up. The effects suite and synthesizer are licensed in the form of software libraries to mobile phone manufacturers and providers of related technology (e.g. DSP's and DSP operating systems), in order to provide polyphonic ringtone rendering and enhanced music or mobile TV playback on hand-held devices.

In 2009, the company was delisted from the NASDAQ exchange. Around 2012, the copyright date on QSound Labs' website was updated. Out of the 40 patents filed by QSound Labs, all have been abandoned or have expired (the last patent to expire was in 2013). The current status of the company is unknown, as such it is assumed to be inactive or defunct.

== See also ==
- Aureal Semiconductor
- Creative Technology
- Sensaura
