= GameCODA =

Audio middleware

- Developer(s): Sensaura, Creative Technology
- Initial release: 2003
- Final release: 2.1
- Middleware: Audio
- Platform: Windows, Xbox, Xbox 360, PlayStation 2, GameCube
- Website: GameCODA - About at the Wayback Machine (archived January 26, 2006)

GameCODA is an audio middleware product by Sensaura designed for game developers to create realistic sound environments in video games. It allows development for the following platforms: Microsoft Windows, Xbox, Xbox 360, PlayStation 2 and GameCube. GameCODA incorporates several audio technologies that were developed by Sensaura, which includes Sensaura's HRTF algorithms, MacroFX™, ZoomFX™ and EnvironmentFX™.

== History ==
On March 12, 2002, GameCODA was announced. The middleware was intended to reduce the costs associated with implementing audio into video games. After Sensaura was acquired by Creative Technology, Sensaura focused solely on GameCODA. Incorporating Sensaura's existing technologies, GameCODA brought 3D audio to multiple platforms in a streamlined way, having standardization through Sensaura's Hardware Abstraction Layer (SAL), which was supported across all popular platforms at the time.

== CAGE Producer ==
CAGE Producer is the central audio asset management tool which bundles the sound samples into sample banks, sound banks and reverb banks for the target console platforms. It cannot edit audio assets itself apart from sample rate, channels and size; an audio editor is needed for anything more than that. It communicates with the CAGE plugins for positioning of sound and reverb environments on the basis of the 3D geometry. The CAGE plugins were available for Maya and 3D Studio Max.

== Audio technology ==
Logos showing each platform that supports GameCODA

=== Sensaura 3D Positional Audio (S-3DPA) ===
Using HRTF and detailed positioning of sound sources, GameCODA can create aurally accurate 3D audio environments. For more information, see Sensaura 3D Positional Audio

=== 3D speaker technology ===
==== XTC (Transaural Crosstalk Cancellation) ====
XTC algorithm which tries to reduce acoustic crosstalk. It uses both the distance and angle of the loudspeakers to calculate precisely the transaural crosstalk level and then generates an appropriate cancellation signal. For more information, see Sensaura 3D speaker technology

== Environmental audio technologies ==
Sensaura developed different technologies to create a more realistic audio environment for the listener:

=== MacroFX ===
MacroFX is an algorithm that tries to create realistic close-up effects.

=== ZoomFX ===
ZoomFX was a technology for simulating the sound of large emitters. This is achieved by creating each virtual sound area from several, similar, virtual point sources, rather than from a single point source, as is commonly done.

=== EnvironmentFX ===
EnvironmentFX technology models different acoustic environments allowing the generation of early reflections and reverberation, in order to produce an immersive 3D audio environment. Not just with sounds themselves, it also factors in the acoustic contribution of the environment.

== See also ==
- EAX
- Digital signal processing
- Sensaura
- Sound card
- Creative Technology
- Aureal Semiconductor
