= Crystal River Engineering =

American technology company (1989–1997)

- Type: Subsidiary
- Industry: Audio Technologies
- Founded: 1989
- Defunct: 1997
- Fate: Dissolved by Aureal after merger. Assets were later acquired by Creative Technology
- Successor: AuSIM
- Headquarters: Fremont, California
- Key people: Scott Foster, Founder Jonathan Abel, Chief Scientist
- Brands: AudioReality
- Parent: Aureal Semiconductor
- Website: www.cre.com at the Wayback Machine (archived May 22, 1998)

Crystal River Engineering Inc. was an American technology company best known for their pioneering work in HRTF based real-time binaural, or 3D sound processing hardware and software. The company was founded in 1989 by Scott Foster after he received a contract from NASA to create the audio component of VIEW (Virtual Environment Workstation Project), a virtual reality based training simulator for astronauts. Crystal River Engineering was acquired by Aureal Semiconductor in 1996.

Crystal River's innovations in the field of real-time 3D audio processing were published in a series of papers by NASA's Elizabeth Wenzel and Crystal River's Scott Foster.

== History ==
The first prototype of the Convolvotron was presented to NASA in 1988. In 1989, Crystal River was incorporated by Scott Foster as one of four spin-off companies of NASA's VIEW project (companies included: VPL Research, Fakespace labs and Telepresence Research). In 1991/1992, CRE formed a partnership with Telepresence Research, VPL Research and Division Inc. to provide audio components for integrated VR systems.

Prior to Aureal's acquisition, CRE's technology was showcased at multiple exhibits across America. Intel's Virtual Reality exhibit featured multiple Beachtrons and Convolvotrons at the Guggenheim Museum in New York in 1993. Two Acoustetrons were further used in Brenda Laurel's Placeholder VR experience. Char Davies created two VR experiences in 1995, with Osmose and Ephémère in 1998, both using an Acoustetron. CRE during this time also opened up an R&D and marketing and sales office in Palo Alto, California.

After merging with Aureal Semiconductor in the spring of 1996, CRE continued to develop and productize high-end, leading edge 3D audio technology for research, simulation and pro audio markets. Aureal created a cut-down solution of CRE's 3D audio technology for mainstream PC and consumer markets, rebranding the technology as A3D. CRE continued to produce products for non-consumers until 1997, when the CRE subsidiary was terminated. Aureal then focused entirely on the entertainment sector.

William Chapin was the second title of Chief Engineer at CRE, in 1997 he negotiated the rights to certain technologies of Aureal/CRE. He later founded AuSIM in 1998 to fill the gap CRE left in the market. AuSIM superseded CRE by developing new 3D audio hardware while providing support for existing CRE users.

In September 2000, Aureal went bankrupt due to a lawsuit with Creative Technology. All of CRE's and Aureal's assets were later acquired by Creative Technology.

== Awards ==
The Beachtron was awarded Cyberedge "Journal Virtual Reality Product of the Year 1993" in 1994.

Snapshot was awarded Cyberedge "Journal Virtual Reality Product of the Year 1994" in 1995.

== Technology ==
=== Convolvotron ===
Audio Reality - CRE's high-end audio technology

The first prototype of the Convolvotron was presented to NASA in 1988. Being later released in 1989, priced at US$14,995. A high-speed, digital-signal processing system capable of presenting eight binaural sound sources in a virtual environment. A two-board set for PCs, the Convolvotron forms the basis for a range of products, from high-end parallel processors to lower-cost single-source modules.

A custom, parallel ALU convolution engine, which is integrated to a TMS 320C25 DSP system. Each convolution engine has 128 16x16 ALU's. Up to eight Convolvotron boardsets can be run in parallel to spatialize 32 anechoic sound sources or 8 sounds sources with first-order reflections simulating an acoustic environment.

=== Acoustetron ===
The Acoustetron was developed and shown in 1990. The hardware was sold at US$49,995. A complete integrated 3D audio workstation for use in high-end VR applications. The system is based on a 15-slot industrialized PC (19-inch rack mount) containing sound source and spatialization cards (as required for a particular application). Complex multisource models (including reflection and doppler effects) can be achieved with the modular architecture.

As a 3D audio subsystem, hardware and software, it provides a common control interface for a host system. Internally, an Acoustetron may be configured with most CRE spatialization hardware. The hardware that can be used includes the flagship Convolvotron and the low-cost Beachtron that have MIDI synthesis and waveform playback capabilities. A typical high-end Acoustetron configuration would be outfitted with 4 Convolvotrons and 4 Beachtrons, with the Beachtrons supplying doppler, reverb, synthesis, sample playback, and special effects.

=== Beachtron ===
In 1993, the Beachtron was launched, a PC DSP add-in card, essentially an affordable Convolvotron priced at US$1,795 compared to $14,995 of the Convolvotron. A high-speed, digital-signal processing system capable of producing 3D sound at a relatively low cost. The single card set can be used to simulate two independent sound sources in a virtual environment. The Beachtron is software compatible with all CRE products and supports the virtual audio protocol.

=== Alphatron ===
The Alphatron has 2 channels with 16-bit audio quality and was priced at US$495.

=== Acoustetron II ===
During 1994, an Acoustetron II prototype ran for three months at a modern art center as part of a Virtual Reality exhibit. The Acoustetron II (for SGI and other high-end graphics workstations) was released the same year. It was intended to generate high-end 3D audio on 3D graphics workstations, for use in real-time rendered 3D environments, such as VR rides, training simulators, and virtual prototyping systems.

The Acoustetron II was a standalone 3D sound server that communicates with a central simulation computer. Audio can come from wave sound files or external inputs (such as CD's, microphones etc.). The sound server was able to process sounds at 44.1 Hz 16-bit (CD quality) for 8 sources at a time, the audio quality could be halved for a total 16 separate spatialized sound sources. Speakers, headphones, or earphones could be used for listening. The sound server supported an ANSI C function interface, allowing interactive control of the 3D audio environment(s). Environmental effects such as Doppler, and sound reflections off surfaces can also be modelled.

=== Snapshot ===
CRE's “Snapshot” system allows measurement of diffuse-field HRTFs in a reflective environment. Early reflections from the measurement environment are removed, allowing replication of an anechoic measurement in an untreated room, without requiring a treated anechoic chamber.

=== ProTron ===
In 1993, the ProTron, a 3D sound mixing environment for sound designers and recording engineers, was released as a software plug-in for Digidesign's TDM architecture at US$995. The ProTron plugin allows for simulation of psychoacoustic cues and environmental effects. Ted Tanner Jr, a former engineer at Digidesign Inc was the lead product developer. The mouse is used to place sources in three-dimensions, using a slider for vertical Z adjustment with a 2D plane to position in X and Y directions. ProTron can be seen as a very early version of Aureal's A3D Player, created after CRE's acquisition by Aureal.

== See also ==
- AuSIM
- HRTF (Head-related transfer function)
- Sound card
- Creative Technology
