= Zii EGG =

Zii EGG Stemcell Computer
- Manufacturer: ZiiLABS
- Type: Platform developmental device, Portable Media Player
- Released: August 2009; 17 years ago
- Media: Flash memory, SD card
- Operating system: Android; ZiiLABS' Plaszma OS; Both based on the Linux kernel
- CPU: Zii Labs ZMS-05
- Memory: 0-32 GB (flash memory); Support for up to an additional 32 GB via SD card slot
- Graphics: Zii Labs ZMS-05
- Input: Multi-touch Touchscreen
- Camera: Two, one High Definition, and one VGA
- Connectivity: USB; Wi-Fi; Bluetooth 2.0; HDMI
- Dimensions: 115 x 62 x 12 mm
- Weight: 108 grams
- Predecessor: Creative ZEN

The Zii EGG is a handheld product platform from Creative Technology subsidiary ZiiLABS. According to ZiiLABS, the Zii Egg was designed for OEM sales, meaning that the device was marketed to sell to third parties rather than retail customers where they can modify it and sell it under their own brand rather than Creative or ZiiLABS. Creative later introduced a consumer model, the Creative Zii. The Egg was announced at the end of July 2009 with ZiiLABS' Plaszma OS platform and support for Google's Android OS. The EGG was shipped from ZiiLABS in the later half of August 2009. The first available firmware with Android was released on November 2, 2009.

According to the Zii website the Zii EGG could provide 1080p video, and the media engine for video codec, media processing and 3D graphics acceleration is an array of floating-point processors (most likely some kind of digital signal processor cores) called StemCells. The ZMS-05 used in the Zii EGG has 24 of these processing units.

== Specifications ==
Sources:

- Capacitive 10-point multi-gesture touch display
- Internal hardware GPS receiver
- 3.5” 320x480 color display
- Bluetooth 2.1 + EDR (only A2DP is currently supported, and is not yet implemented in their Android port)
- X-Fi software support (not yet implemented in the ZiiLABS SDKs)
- 3-axis accelerometer
- Up to 32 GB of internal flash storage
- SDHC slot (supports up to 32 GB of external SDHC card)
- Ambient light sensor
- 32 MB NOR Flash (Linux Kernel Boot ROM)
- 256 MB mobile DDR SDRAM
- 720p and 1080p output (this only works via a proprietary adapter which has not been sold for over 6 months, though it is available via the Zii Dock accessory which is now available for sale)
- Composite video out (this only works via a proprietary adapter which has not been sold for over 6 months, though it is available via the Zii Dock accessory which is now available for sale)
- Microphone
- 2 cameras: 1 forward-facing VGA camera, 1 rear-facing HD camera
- 1200 mAH rechargeable lithium-ion battery
- Wi-Fi 802.11 b/g

=== Output connections ===
- USB 2.0 Mini-B (MTP and Charging)
- ZiiLink (a proprietary type of connector which is only available currently via the Zii Link ZiiEGG-docking station)
- HDMI (via ZiiLink)
- Component VGA (via ZiiLink)
- 3.5 mm headphone connector
- Built in mono speaker

== See also ==
- Creative ZEN
- Creative Technology
- Zii Labs
- Creative Zii
