= Larry Ryckman =

Canadian businessman

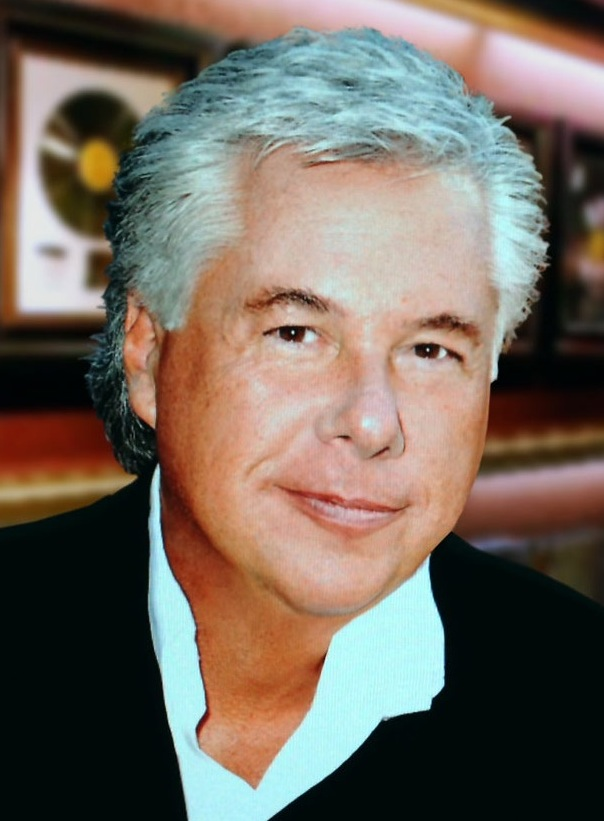
- Larry Ryckman
- Born: August 28, 1959 (age 67); Toronto, Ontario, Canada
- Occupations: Music industry executive President and CEO of Aftermaster Audio Labs
- Known for: Music Mastering, Audio Technologies, Hollywood recording studios, Entertainment Executive
- Notable work: Janet Jackson, Lady Gaga, Sting, Empire, RayJ, Madonna, Michael Jackson, Nick Cannon, Emmy Awards

Lawrence G. Ryckman (born August 28, 1959) is a Canadian born American music industry executive known for his knowledge of audio production and mastering and the development of patented audio and video technologies used in the music and entertainment industries. He is president and CEO of AfterMaster Audio Labs and Recording Studios in Hollywood, California, part of Scottsdale, Arizona-based Aftermaster, Inc. In November 2014, recording artist Justin Timberlake joined Ryckman as a co-owner of AfterMaster.

== Career ==
=== American Artists ===
In 1982, Ryckman served as vice president, development, of the film and TV production company American Artists, Inc. He became president and CEO in 1984 and produced several feature films including The Virgin Queen of St. Francis High, ''Snowballs'', and ''Crime of the Century''.

At about this time Ryckman produced, hosted and narrated a one-hour documentary, The Aryan Nation, an exposé of Aryan Nations and the growing neo-Nazi movements in North America, filmed partly inside the Aryan Nations Hayden Lake Idaho compound.

=== Music ===
In 1986, Ryckman co-founded Archer Communications, Inc./QSound Labs, Ltd., an audio technology company which developed proprietary audio technologies for the music, film, TV, computer and video game industries. QSound developed the first patented three-dimensional audio process for playback through traditional stereo. Ryckman assembled a team of entertainment industry professionals to assist in building the company, including CAA co-founder Michael Ovitz, music industry veterans Jimmy Iovine, Shelly Yakus, music producer Bob Ezrin, film producer, George J. Folsey and Warner Bros. director Salah Hassanein. Todd-Ao/Glen Glenn Studios then the world's largest motion picture and television sound studios became a large stakeholder which led QSound to be utilized in various feature film productions including, Robin Hood, Prince of Thieves.

In 1990, Ryckman and music attorney Allen Grubman negotiated a deal in the music industry with Polygram NV, then the world's largest record company, for the payment of a mechanical royalty on all albums sold that were mixed with QSound. Ryckman oversaw the engineering of several albums using QSound including Madonna's "The Immaculate Collection", Michael Jackson's "Dangerous', Paula Abdul's "Spellbound", Sting's "The Soul Cages" and Julian Lennon's "Help Yourself". In addition, three music recordings engineered with QSound during Ryckman's tenure won GRAMMY awards including the motion picture soundtrack, Robin Hood, Prince of Thieves. The Company achieved a market capitalization approaching $500 million and was covered in Barron's, LA Times, Wall Street Journal, The New York Times and The Hollywood Reporter.

After the company's first profitable quarter, Ryckman moved from CEO to co-chairman of QSound and teamed up with QSound VP of Music, Jimmy Iovine, to start a music label which was the impetus for Interscope Records. Shortly thereafter Ryckman was approached to purchase the Calgary Stampeders of the CFL and left the music industry to pursue the ownership of the team.

=== Sports ===
In 1991, Ryckman purchased and privatized the Calgary Stampeders Football Club of the Canadian Football League (CFL). At the time the team was struggling financially and Ryckman was widely credited for saving the team. Many changes took place under his ownership, including the signing of Heisman Trophy winning quarterback Doug Flutie, quarterback Jeff Garcia from San Jose State and future pro wrestling superstar Dwayne "The Rock" Johnson and in team management and player personnel. A new marketing campaign was built around "The New Calgary Stampeders". During his tenure the Stampeders broke a number of league and team records, participated in five Grey Cup Championship games, and won the Grey Cup in Toronto in 1992, for the first time in 21 years. Part of the marketing campaign was one of extortion: at one point he demanded that Stampeders fans buy 16,000 season tickets or else he would move the team to San Antonio, Texas.

During his five years in the CFL, Ryckman co-chaired the CFL expansion committee with late actor John Candy and served on the Executive Committee of the CFL Board of Governors. In 1993, he purchased the rights to host the 1993 Grey Cup game for the City of Calgary. That year, he declined the playoff bye the Stampeders had earned in order to get another playoff home game and the ticket sales that resulted from it. The 1993 Grey Cup festival drew a capacity crowd of over 50,000 spectators. Ryckman constructed and donated new private luxury boxes at the Stampeders home field, McMahon Stadium in Calgary. Ryckman was subsequently awarded the CFL's Outstanding Contribution Award for his contributions to both the league and as a Governor.

Ryckman was a major advocate of the CFL's American expansion, with part of the rationale being that the expansion fees could serve as a source of revenue for the existing franchises.

In 1995, the Alberta Securities Commission levied costs of its investigation on Ryckman after he was found guilty of stock manipulation in a regulatory hearing, that despite Ryckman's objections, was conducted outside of Alberta civil and criminal courts. Ryckman chose to place the team into receivership to eliminate over $5 million in government debt that he had assumed in his purchase of the team, in order to sell it to Sig Gutsche of Calgary, which was announced and arranged a year before the sale. The final sale of the team was made on April 3, 1996, to Sig Gutsche. Whereas Ryckman had restored interest in the Stampeders and made it a Championship team after 21 years, Gutsche was able to rectify the team's debts and make it profitable again.

=== MyStudio ===
In 2004, Ryckman founded MyStudio, Inc., a private company established to develop MyStudio interactive recording studios, Mystudio.net and related technologies. MyStudio was the world's first self-contained, interactive audio and video recording studio available for consumer use. In 2007, Ryckman sold his interest in MyStudio to public company, Studio One Media, Inc. in an all-stock transaction valued at $30 million and became the largest shareholder of Studio One.

As CEO of MyStudio, Ryckman negotiated multi-year deals with Simon Cowell's "The X Factor," Mark Burnett Productions, The GRAMMY Foundation, EMI Music Publishing, Universal Music, Sony/ATV, Hard Rock International, Warner Music Nashville and the Queen Latifah Show. Multiple patents have been issued and filed relating to MyStudio and its underlying processes and technologies.

In 2008, Ryckman negotiated a music license with publishing giant EMI which allowed consumers for the first time to legally create music videos in a publicly accessible venue using popular music for unlimited online posting. The EMI license was followed up with multi-year licenses with Universal Music, Sony ATV and BMG.

In April, 2011, Ryckman finalized a multi-year agreement involving stakeholders Fox, Freemantle, Sony and Simco for the use of MyStudio's for Simon Cowell's "The X Factor."

=== AfterMaster Audio ===
In 2006, Ryckman and audio engineer Shelly Yakus embarked on a multimillion-dollar, multi-year development effort to create AfterMaster HD Audio through AfterMaster Audio Labs. Inc. The proprietary AfterMaster hardware and software process creates an audio process and master recording with a loudness, fullness and clarity which AfterMaster claims is unachievable through traditional mastering techniques. The first major music releases using MyStudio AfterMaster HD Audio process were Janet Jackson's "Make Me" produced by Rodney "Darkchild" Jerkins, and Lady Gaga's multi-platinum "Telephone."

AfterMaster's music mastering process for independent artists, "ProMaster", became the first online independent music mastering service. with marketing partners Guitar Center and later Tunecore. AfterMaster also entered into an agreement wherein its ProMaster division remastered 6,000,000 songs for independent artists for the online independent music website, ReverbNation.

AfterMaster took over the former production offices of Alfred Hitchcock at the Crossroads of the World complex, establishing six recording and mastering studios.

Ryckman serves as Chairman of the AfterMaster Advisory Board which includes music producer, Rodney "Darkchild" Jerkins, songwriter, Diane Warren, music producer, Richard Perry, media investor, Ted Field, former Atlantic, Capitol and Virgin music CEO, Jason Flom, casting director, Sheila Jaffe, former Lucasfilm CEO, Charles Weber, music producer and engineer, Jack Douglas, former Interscope CEO of Urban Music, Ron Gillyard, film producer, Gary Goldstein and former Virgin and Warner music CEO, Phil Quartararo.

On April 1, 2014, ON Semiconductor, a multinational developer and manufacturer of semiconductors partnered with AfterMaster Audio Labs to incorporate AfterMaster Audio in semiconductor chips for use in consumer electronic products. In November 2014, superstar Justin Timberlake joined AfterMaster Audio Labs as a co-owner. In 2016, mastering engineer Pete Doell joined as head of Aftermaster's music mastering.

In 2017, Ryckman and his partner Shelly Yakus took over and renovated the 40-year-old Graham Nash recording studio in Hollywood, at which many well-known artists had recorded. The studio was upgraded to include an 80 track SSL 4000 G+ console and up-to-date gear and instruments.

=== Honors and awards ===
Aftermaster was awarded the Technical Achievement Award at the 2010 Hollywood Music and Media Awards for its MyStudio and AfterMaster HD Audio technologies developed by Ryckman and his engineering team. Aftermaster's patented technology and products were recognized with three awards at the 2016 CES show in Las Vegas.

Ryckman received Canada's Vanier Award for Outstanding Young Canadian in 1993 for his business and community accomplishments.

=== Discography ===
Mastering (partial list):

- Aerosmith - We All Fall Down
- Akon - One In The Chamber (Single release on 2014 GRAMMY nominated album)
- Alice Cooper - Madhouse Rock Tour
- Diddy - I Hate That You Love Me (Platinum)
- Donna Summer - To Paris With Love (Billboard #1 Dance)
- Emmy Awards - Born To Run - Jimmy Fallon
- Janet Jackson - Make Me (Billboard #1 Hot Dance Club Songs Platinum)
- Jill Scott - From The Vault
- Jordin Sparks - It Ain't You.
- Kerli - Army Of Love - (Billboard #1 Hot Dance Club Songs)
- Lady Gaga - Telephone (Multi-platinum, Billboard #1 Pop)
- Nick Cannon - White People Party Music
- Mack Wilds - Own It (Single release on 2014 GRAMMY nominated album)
- Ray J - 1 Thing Leads To Another

QSound mixing credits:

- Michael Jackson - Dangerous (multi-platinum)
- Madonna - The Immaculate Collection (multi-platinum)
- Sting - The Soul Cages (multi-platinum)
- Paula Abdul - Spellbound (multi-platinum)
- Julian Lennon - Help Yourself

=== Patents ===
Patents issued: Audio Process, Live Broadcast Interview, Low/High Resolution, Studio Booth - United States Patents: 8,508,572, 8,169,548, 8,144,257, 8,089,564, 9,390,698.

== Personal life ==
He married Elaine (Howes) Ryckman and together they have three children, Lauren, Aaron and Kiera.

=== Charity ===
Ryckman has been active with several charitable organizations including the Easter Seals, Uncles at Large, Cystic Fibrosis and Cancer Society. Ryckman currently serves on the advisory board of the Felix Organization whose principals include Sheila Jaffe, Darryl McDaniels and Mark Wahlberg. Ryckman was the Executive Producer of the Felix PSA video "Walk This Way" which was directed by Penny Marshall and featured Aerosmith and 25 celebrities. The Felix Organization sends hundreds of underprivileged inner-city foster kids to summer camp every year.
