= Creative Wireless Speakers =

Range of wireless speakers

The ZiiSound, Inspire and Creative Wireless Speakers is a range of wireless speakers by Creative Technology, which utilizes Bluetooth technology and apt-X audio codec for high-quality wireless streaming of audio.

Their first wireless speaker, The Inspire S2 Wireless 2.1 Speaker System, was released on 1 October 2009 . Chosen from a field of 54 devices, it was awarded the Bluetooth Special Interest Group (Bluetooth SIG) Overall Best of CES Award at the 2010 Consumer Electronics Show in Las Vegas, USA. Their second release, The ZiiSound D5, was awarded the Red Dot design award, an international product design prize awarded by the Design Zentrum Nordrhein Westfalen in Germany.

All wireless speakers features Bluetooth technology, enabling all Bluetooth devices to stream their audio to the speakers without separate adapters or transmitters. Some models are equipped with apt-X, a high performance low-latency audio codec for stereo Bluetooth audio.

== Current Wireless Speakers ==
To date, Creative Technology has released a total of 7 wireless speakers, in addition to the latest ZiiSound DX Series, which comprises 2 wireless modular speakers and 1 wireless modular subwoofer.

=== ZiiSound DX Series ===
ZiiSound D5x, ZiiSound D3x and ZiiSound DSx are a series of modular wireless one-piece speakers and subwoofers launched under the pure wireless modularity range, in May 2011. These speakers are intend as an alternative to fixed speakers units, these modular devices allow users to connect multiple speaker and subwoofer units. Each speaker unit can be positioned together in one location and programmed to function as left/middle/right channels, or broken apart to be placed in different rooms, playing from the same music source. Up to three of the same speaker model can be connected wirelessly with a ZiiSound DSx wireless subwoofer to form a 3.1 wireless speaker system. Unofficially, a user is able to form up to a 3.4 configuration.

=== ZiiSound T6 2.1 Wireless Speaker ===
The ZiiSound T6 is modeled after the GigaWorks T3. It is targeted at users requiring compact speaker system with surround sound capabilities for movies and gaming. Digital 5.1 audio is enabled via USB with 5.1 decoder software like PowerDVD. The Swivel-Speaker-Array design of the satellite speakers also provide with a wider soundstage by manually rotating the top portion of each satellite, which are also wall-mountable. The corresponding subwoofer delivers deep, tight bass in a portless, compact enclosure, and can be further enhanced by placing it against a wall.

The ZiiSound T6 comes with an extended volume dial for switching between music sources with AUX-in connectivity, an infrared remote, a Bluetooth USB Transmitter and a Bluetooth Transmitter for iPhone/iPod.

=== ZiiSound D5 One-Piece Wireless Speaker ===
The ZiiSound D5 uses the same technology as the Inspire S2 Wireless. It is a Bluetooth, apt-X powered one-piece wireless speaker intended for use with Apple’s iPhone and iPod, and certified under the Made for iPod programme. The ZiiSound D5 comes with a Bluetooth transmitter that can be attached to the iPhone and iPod, and transmits apt-X encoded wireless audio to the speaker. The speaker also works with the iPhone’s/iPod’s built-in Bluetooth functionality. When needed, the BT-D5 can also be docked to the ZiiSound D5 for charging.

The ZiiSound D5 is the firm's first one-piece wireless speaker. It was also awarded the red dot design award for its sleek design. Its one-piece body design minimizes sounds distortion and its cloth mesh allows audio to be accurately produced. It has a capacitive touch-sensitive volume dial and an AUX-in option at the back of the speaker.

=== Inspire S2 Wireless 2.1 Wireless Speaker ===
Inspire S2 Wireless is the firm's first Bluetooth wireless speaker system. Based on the Inspire S2 wired speaker system, the Inspire S2 Wireless features 2 palm-sized satellites and a compact subwoofer with the firm's proprietary DIRECT-THROW design for enhanced bass. The right satellite has built-in volume controls and an AUX-in port; the bass controls are on the back of the subwoofer. Audio transmission to the speakers is wireless, but the satellites are wired to the subwoofer, which is plugged into a wall AC. The Inspire S2 Wireless was awarded the Best of CES 2010, by the Bluetooth Special Interest Group for its innovative use of the Bluetooth technology, beating finalists from Microsoft, Nokia, Motorola, Samsung, Sony and Sennheiser.

"A heartfelt congratulations to Creative and apt-X for their Best of CES 2010 Overall Winner award for the Creative Inspire S2 Wireless speakers. These wireless speakers bring together functionality, innovative design and a positive user experience to capture the very best in the evolution of Bluetooth technology." -- Michael Foley, Ph.D., Executive Director, Bluetooth SIG.

== See also ==
- Loudspeaker
- Loudspeaker enclosure
