= Sim Wong Hoo =

Singaporean businessman (1955–2023)

- 沈望傅
- Sim in 2017
- Born: 1955; Colony of Singapore
- Died: 4 January 2023 (aged 67–68); Singapore
- Education: Ngee Ann Technical College
- Title: Founder and CEO of Creative Technology

Chinese name
- Chinese: 沈望傅
Transcriptions
Standard Mandarin
- Hanyu Pinyin: Shěn Wàngfù
Yue: Cantonese
- Jyutping: Sam^{2} Mong^{6} Fu^{6}
Southern Min
- Hokkien POJ: Sím Bōng-hù

Sim Wong Hoo (Chinese: 沈望傅; 1955 – 4 January 2023) was a Singaporean inventor and billionaire entrepreneur known for founding Creative Technology, a designer and manufacturer of products for personal computers and personal digital entertainment devices. He was the chairman and chief executive officer of Creative Technology from 1981 until his death in 2023. Creative Technology is notable for its products such as the Sound Blaster audio card and the Creative ZEN range of audio and media products.

== Early life and education ==
Sim was born into a Zhao'an Hokkien family in the Colony of Singapore. He attended Bukit Panjang Government High School, before graduating from Ngee Ann Technical College (now Ngee Ann Polytechnic) in 1975. After completing his mandatory National Service, Sim worked in the private engineering sector for a year.

== Career ==
On 1 July 1981, with a capital outlay of S$10,000, Sim, along with former schoolmate Ng Kai Wa, opened a computer repair shop in Pearl's Centre, in Chinatown, and founded Creative Technology.

Sim started by developing and selling an add-on memory boards for the Apple II computer. Creative Technology subsequently began creating customised PCs adapted for the Chinese language, including enhanced audio capabilities that allowed the devices to produce speech and melodies.

In 1988, Sim established an office in the United States, and began selling Sound Blaster, a stand-alone sound card. It was among the first dedicated audio processing cards widely available to general consumers. Creative Technology dominated the PC audio market until the 2000s, when OEM PCs began to be built with integrated sound boards in the motherboard. Sound Blaster then found itself reduced to a niche product.

In May 2006, Creative Technology filed suit against Apple Inc. for violating their "Zen patent", which pertained to patent infringement with their iPod, iPod nano and iPod mini players. Apple countersued Creative Technology, and then launched a second suit pertaining to icons and data display and entry in such portable devices. In August 2006, Apple announced it would be paying $100,000,000 to Creative Technology to license the hierarchical user interface outlined in the Zen patent.

In late 2011, Sim announced a new product, the HanZpad, at a news conference in Beijing.

== Achievements and recognition ==
Sim won accolades from both industry and government for his innovations. He was awarded the Bintang Bakti Masyarakat (Public Service Star) by Singapore in 2001 for outstanding achievements in the business field. He was named in second spot as Asia's Businessman of the Year in January 2001 by Fortune Magazine.

At age 45, he became the youngest billionaire in Singapore. He was also the first person to be named Singapore's Businessman of the Year twice, in 1992 and 1997. In 2002, he was named Person of the Year by the Singapore Computer Society in recognition of his contribution to the IT industry. Sim was considered to be one of the most famous entrepreneurs of Singapore, and formerly chaired Singapore's Technopreneurship 21 Private Sector Committee.

== Personal life ==
In 1999, Sim released a book entitled Chaotic Thoughts From The Old Millennium, in which he coined and popularised the term "No U-turn syndrome" to describe the stereotypical Singaporean mindset of requiring permission from higher authorities before taking any action.

Sim died suddenly on 4 January 2023. Acquaintances did not notice any difference before his death; his family said that he "passed away peacefully."
