= Dynamic Pictures =

Dynamic Pictures Inc. was a San Jose-based company which produced the Oxygen line of high-end 3D graphics cards. In 1997, they produced three PCI-based models: the Oxygen 102, Oxygen 202, and Oxygen 402. The Oxygen 202 and 402 featured an SLI-like design in providing two and four identical graphics processing units to achieve higher performance. The graphics processing unit was designed by 3D Labs. The four processor Oxygen 402 received a Viewperf CDRS-03 score of 42. In comparison, a much more recent GeForce FX GL (using a Geforce 5800-class GPU) achieves a 1803 on the same test.

The list price for the Oxygen 102 was $1495 1996, later reduced to $399.
