= Cambridge SoundWorks =

Consumer hi-fi audio company

- Company type: Subsidiary
- Founded: 1988; 38 years ago
- Founder: Henry Kloss
- Fate: Acquired by Creative Labs (1997)
- Headquarters: North Andover, Massachusetts
- Key people: Craig McHugh (CEO)
- Products: Consumer audio
- Parent: Creative Technology Ltd.
- Website: cambridgesoundWorks.com

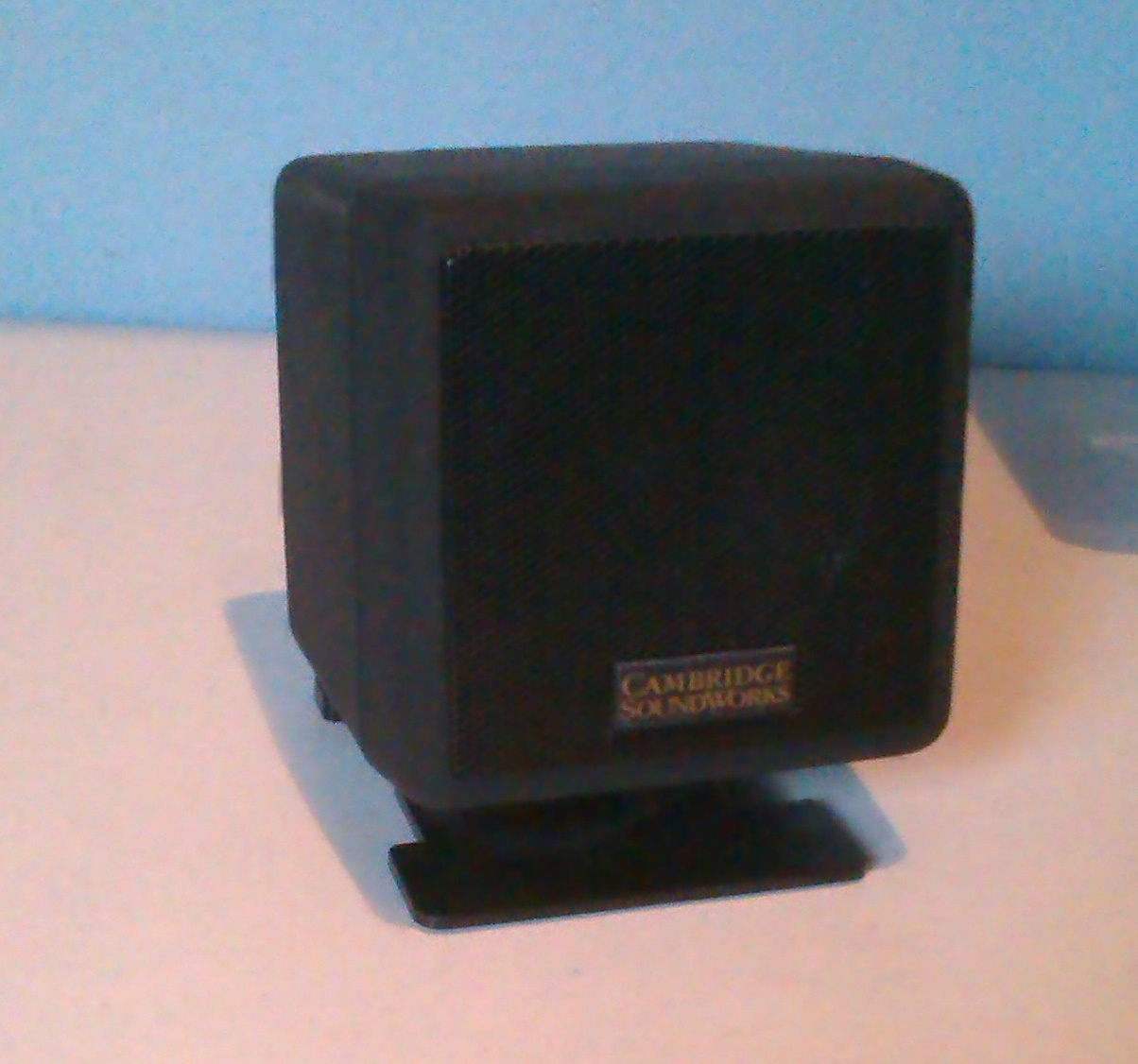
A speaker from a FPS2000 surround set

Cambridge SoundWorks was a Massachusetts-based consumer audio manufacturer and retailer.

== History ==
Cambridge SoundWorks was co-founded in 1988 by Henry Kloss, an audio engineer and businessman, and colleague Tom DeVesto. Kloss had founded or co-founded a number of earlier loudspeaker and consumer audio companies, including Acoustic Research, KLH and Advent Corporation.

It was founded with the specific mission to design and manufacture well-priced, high quality, high performance loudspeakers and audio products to be marketed directly to the consumer. From its inception, the company's success was significant and its products received critical acclaim. Cambridge SoundWorks began offering its products (such as the Ensemble I, II, and III satellite speaker systems) by catalog and multi-page magazine advertisements. In 1991, the company opened its first retail location in Newton, Massachusetts. In 1994 it sold its first products on the Internet, using the CompuServe network. This made it one of the first companies to sell consumer electronics on the Internet.

The formula developed in its first store proved successful and eventually spawned the opening of 30 showrooms in New England and metropolitan San Francisco.

In 1997 Cambridge Soundworks was bought by then Creative Labs.

Eventually, Cambridge SoundWorks manufactured over 60 different models of home stereo, home theater, multimedia speakers and assorted electronics products. Its products were designed in California, with Research and Development and Acoustic Engineering in Massachusetts. These products, along with other major brands of high-performance audio and video components, were sold through an online store.

As of February 2018, the Cambridge Soundworks website redirects to theoontz.com, where a product line of portable bluetooth speakers is sold.

== From 2020 ==
As of 2008, all Cambridge SoundWorks retail showrooms are closed. The company continued to manufacture loudspeakers for home theater and multimedia applications, as well as distribute other brands such as Sony and Marantz. Cambridge SoundWorks marketing also included catalog and internet sales, in addition to worldwide product distribution by partnerships with IBM, Gateway, and the parent company Creative Technology Ltd. Creative ordered Cambridge to reduce the number of products sold under its trademark. It has subsequently gone through to newer owners.
