= Appian Graphics =

Supplier of multi-monitor graphics accelerators

- Type: Division
- Industry: Semiconductors
- Founded: 1994; 32 years ago
- Defunct: 2001
- Fate: Acquired by Colorgraphic Communications, Inc., and ATI Technologies Inc.
- Headquarters: Redmond, Washington, United States
- Products: Graphics processing units
- Parent: ETMA Corporation

Appian Graphics was a supplier of multi-monitor graphics accelerators founded in 1994.

== History ==
The company was best known for its Jeronimo and Gemini product lines, and for the HydraVision display management software. The main competitor for Appian on the multi-monitor solutions market was STB Systems.

The company was acquired in July 2001 by Colorgraphic Communications, Inc., which ceased business in 2007 or 2008.

Appian Graphics originally developed HydraVision in the late 1990s for its multi-head display solutions. ATI Technologies acquired HydraVision in July 2001 along with Appian's HydraVision team to join its then-new dual-head Radeon 7500 and 8500 series.

Appian Rotate was developed in 1998 for hardware accelerated portrait display, it allowed off the shelf graphics components that supported 3D texture mapping for rotating the offscreen desktop screen correctly onto the display out buffer. It has become the default standard in the industry for portrait mode and is still used by display drivers to support portrait display.

== Graphics adapters ==
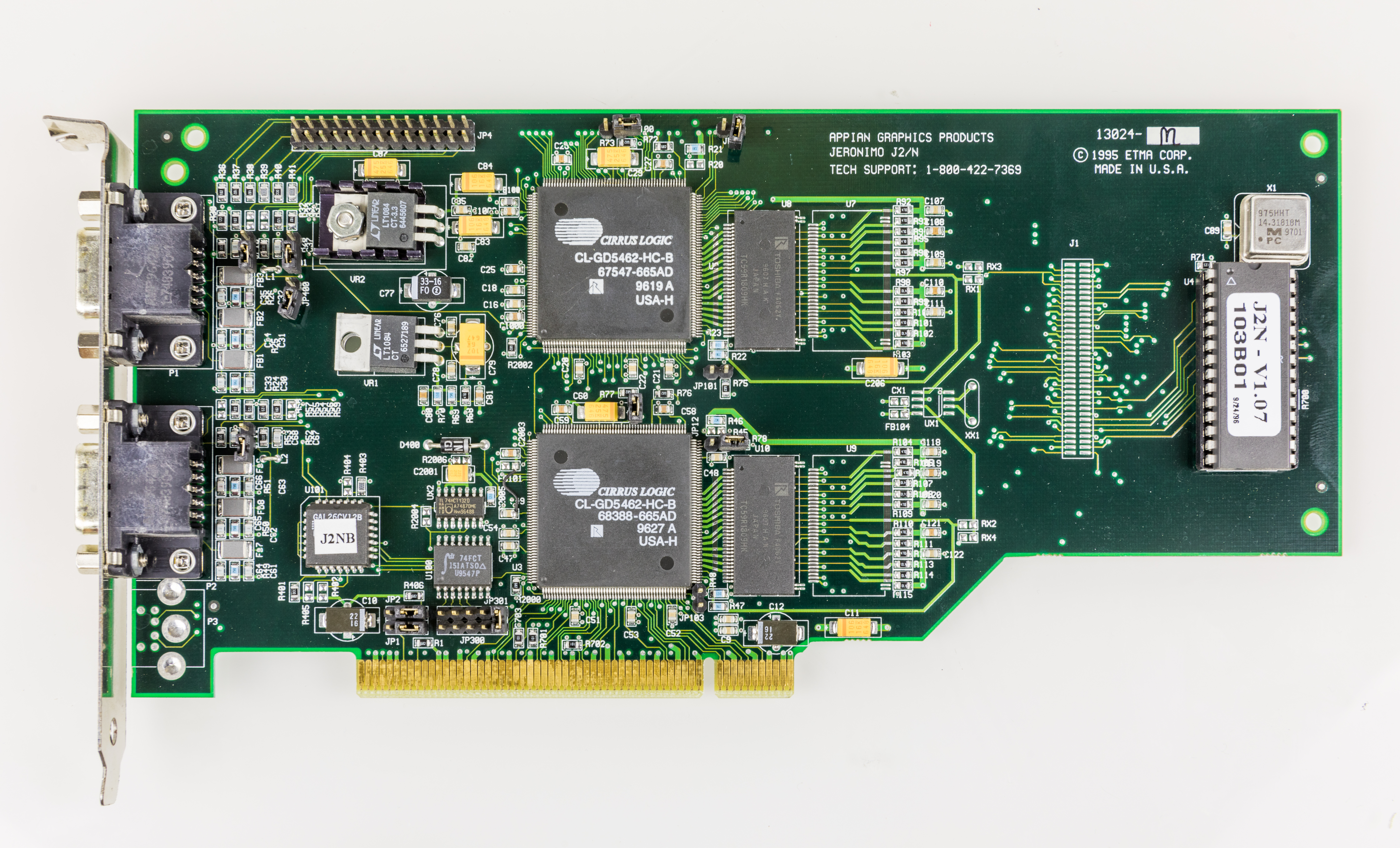
Dual-head Appian Graphics Jeronimo J2/N, 1995 (2× Cirrus Logic CL-GDGD5462-HC-B – 4 MB)

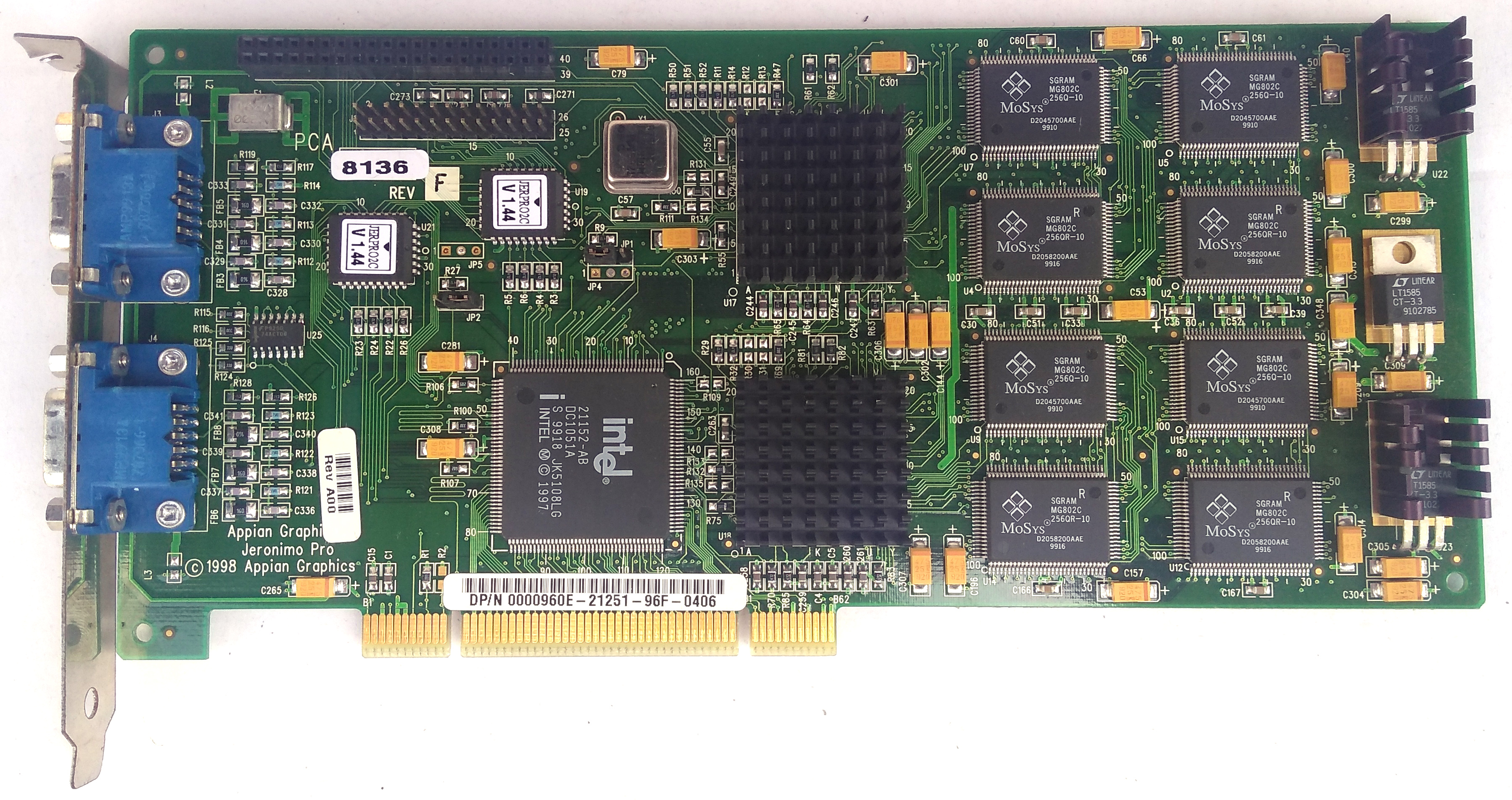
Dual-head Appian Graphics Jeronimo Pro, 1998 (2× 3Dlabs Peremdia 2 – 2× 8 MB)

- Appian Graphics Jeronimo J2/N
  - Dual Head 3/4 size PCI adapter
  - 4 MB
  - Cirrus Logic CL-GDGD5462-HC-B chipset
- Appian Jeronimo Pro
  - Dual Head PCI adapter
  - 8 or 16MB (4 or 8MB/head)
  - 3Dlabs Permedia 2 VPU chipset
- Appian Jeronimo Pro 4-Port
  - Quad Head PCI adapter
  - 32MB (8MB/head)
  - 3Dlabs Permedia 2 VPU chipset
- Appian Jeronimo 2000
  - DualHead PCI adapter
  - 64MB (32MB/head)
  - 3Dlabs Permedia 3 VPU chipset
- Appian Gemini
  - Dual Head AGP 2X adapter
  - 16MB SGRAM
  - S3 Savage MX chipset based
- Appian Rushmore
  - Quad Head PCI adapter
  - 64MB (32MB/head)
  - Dual ATI R100 chipset based
