= No U-turn syndrome =

Term for over-reliance on government direction in Singapore

In Singapore drivers are not allowed to perform a U-turn unless allowed by this traffic sign

No U-turn syndrome (NUTS) is a term coined by Singaporean entrepreneur Sim Wong Hoo to summarise the social behaviour of Singaporeans, whom he described as deferring to higher authorities before proceeding with any action due to its strict legal system and its penalties. He made a comparison of traffic rules in Singapore to those found overseas, to describe the phenomenon. In Singapore, drivers are not allowed to make a U-turn unless a sign specifically allows them to do so, while in some other countries drivers may make U-turns freely so long as a "No U-turn" sign is not present. In a similar manner, this analogy is used to explain the red tape he encountered with bureaucrats, which in turn stifles the very creativity that the Singaporean government has sought to promote.

NUTS is also considered one of the major criticisms of the rigid Singapore education system, where students are taught from a young age to obey instructions in an unquestioning manner, in a society where grades and paper certification are emphasised at the expense of some life skills.

In 2003, the term was referred to by Singaporean MPs during discussions about encouraging entrepreneurship. Five MPs said that "the biggest hurdle for Singaporeans in creating a pro-enterprise environment is the NUTS mentality."
