= U-turn =

Driving technique used when someone performs a 180° rotation

A diagram showing the path of a driver performing a U-turn on a normal two-way road (left-hand traffic)

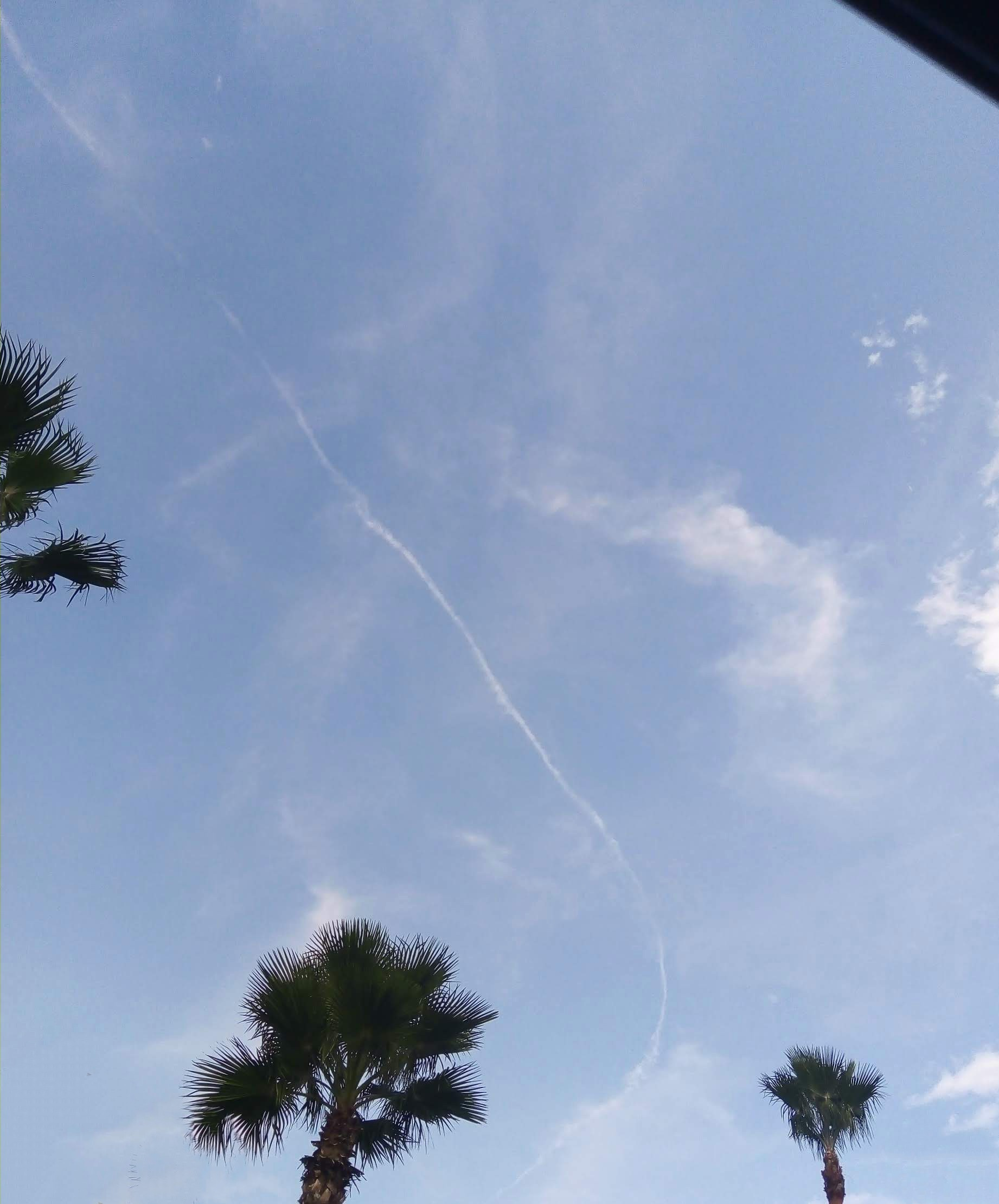
Contrail of a plane that took a U-turn

A U-turn in driving refers to performing a 180° rotation to reverse the direction of travel. It is called a "U-turn" because the maneuver looks like the letter U. In some areas, along with most intersections where so indicated, the maneuver is illegal, while in others, it is treated as a more ordinary turn, merely extended. In still other areas, lanes are occasionally marked "U-turn permitted" or even "U-turn only."

Occasionally, on a divided highway, special U-turn ramps known as turnarounds exist to allow traffic to make a U-turn, though often their use is restricted to emergency and police vehicles only, and if used by passenger vehicles, are specifically limited by authorities to controlled slow-speed and flagger-directed turnarounds away from an incident or closure.

In the United States, U-turn regulations vary by state: in Indiana U-turns are allowed as long as the driver follows all of the precautions normally ascribed to making a left turn (yielding right-of-way, etc.). Many places, including Texas and Georgia, have specially designed U-turn lanes (referred to as Texas U-turn lanes). In Michigan, U-turns are required for many left turns to and from divided highways, as part of the Michigan left maneuver.

In some special situations, U-turns can be regulated through the use of a traffic light, where it is the only directional choice and drivers in the specified lane cannot continue forward (“U-turn only” lanes).

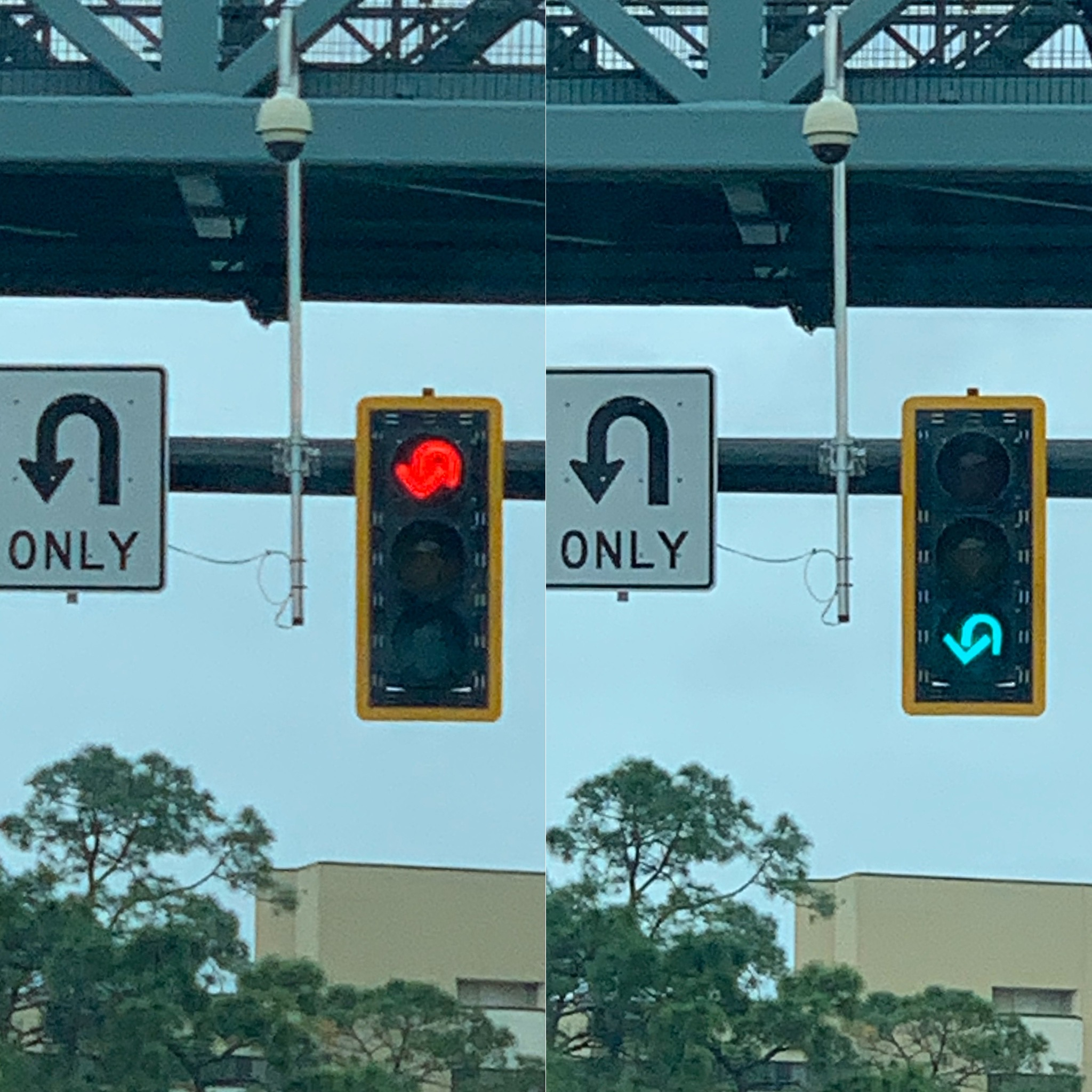
A U-turn traffic light in Lake Buena Vista, Florida, United States

== Prohibited U-turns ==
Although U-turns are considered safer than two and three-point turns, they are often prohibited for various reasons. Sometimes a sign indicates the legality of U-turns. However, traffic regulations in many jurisdictions specifically prohibit certain types of U-turns. Laws vary by jurisdiction as to when a U-turn may or may not be legal. Examples of jurisdictions with codified U-turn prohibitions include the Canadian provinces of Alberta and British Columbia and the U.S. states of Colorado and Oregon.

=== Canada ===
In Alberta, U-turns are prohibited in certain circumstances, for example (ref. Alberta Regulation 304/2002, Division 7):

- At the crest of a hill or on a curve unless the driver can see at least 150 m ahead
- Anywhere a sign prohibits a U-turn
- In urban areas between intersections
- At alleys and driveways
- At an intersection controlled by a traffic signal (unless signage or signals specifically allow this maneuver)
- By a school bus on an undivided highway or on a divided highway where the length of the bus is longer than the width of the median between the two carriageways

Other provinces and territories that prohibit U-turns at traffic signals include Yukon, British Columbia and Saskatchewan.

=== Taiwan ===
In Taiwan, Article 49 of the Act Governing the Punishment of Violation of Road traffic Regulations (zh:道路交通管理處罰條例) administratively fines a motorist 600 to 1800 new Taiwan dollars for any of the following unlawful U-turn:

1. Making a U-turn on a curve, a slope, a narrow road, a narrow bridge, or a tunnel.
2. Making a U-turn at a road segment signed No U-turn or painted double solid yellow or white lines or no-overtaking lines.
3. Making a U-turn at a road segment prohibiting left turn.
4. Not surrounding a roundabout to make a U-turn in such an intersection.
5. Before making a U-turn, failing to stop or signal left turn as required, or making a U-turn without paying attention to vehicles or pedestrians passing by.

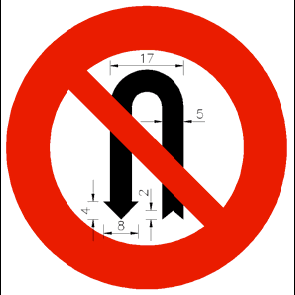
Taiwanese No U-turn sign

In addition, a Taiwanese driver license is demerited one point for an unlawful U-turn pursuant to Article 63 of the same Act unless the license has been suspended or revoked. Furthermore, the same Act makes a U-turn on a railway level crossing a violation for drivers of motorized and non-motorized vehicles:

- Article 54: A driver of a motor vehicle shall be administratively fined 6000 to 12000 new Taiwan dollars for making a U-turn on a railway level crossing. Should an accident occur, the driver license shall also be revoked, which is for life pursuant to Article 67. This lifetime revocation used to be absolute, but the amendment of the law proclaimed on 28 December 2005 and effective on 1 July 2006 has allowed a possible waiver after serving at least six years of the revocation.
- Article 75: A driver of a non-motorized vehicle (e.g. a bicycle) shall be administratively fined 1200 to 2400 New Taiwan dollars for making a U-turn on a railway level crossing.

== See also ==
- Hairpin turn
- Jughandle
- No U-turn syndrome
- Texas U-turn
- Three-point turn
- Turning radius
- Wrong-way driving
