= Sensaura =

American audio technology company

Sensaura Ltd.
- Type: Subsidiary
- Industry: Audio Technologies
- Founded: 1991; 35 years ago
- Defunct: 2008
- Fate: Acquired by Creative Technology and merged with 3Dlabs, now dissolved
- Successor: Sonaptic Ltd.
- Headquarters: Middlesex
- Brands: gameCODA; S-3DPA
- Parent: Creative Technology
- Website: www.sensaura.com at the Wayback Machine (archived June 22, 2007)

Sensaura Ltd., a division of Creative Technology, was a company that provided 3D audio effect technology for the interactive entertainment industry. Sensaura technology was shipped on more than 24 million game consoles and 150 million PCs (on soundcards, motherboards and external USB audio devices). Formed in 1991, Sensaura developed a range of technologies for incorporating 3D audio into PC's and consoles.

== History ==
Sensaura's SPU-800 could create a 360° sound-stage in an audio recording through traditional speakers.

Following its origin as a research project at Thorn EMI's Central Research Laboratories ("CRL", based in Hayes, United Kingdom) in 1991, Sensaura become a supplier of 3D audio technology. By 1998, Sensaura had licensed its technology to the audio chip manufacturers (ESS Technology, Crystal Semiconductor/Cirrus Logic and Yamaha), who at that time supplied 70% of the PC audio market. Subsequent licensees included NVIDIA, Analog Devices, VIA Technologies (expired, replaced by QSound) and C-Media Electronics.

In 1993, Sensaura released a CD sampler disc 'beyond stereo...' containing four tracks;

1. Roadside

2. Railway Station

3. RAF Band

4. Falla: Final Dance from "The Three-Cornered Hat"

These tracks, recorded live, were intended to illustrate what could be achieved in terms of 3D sound from a two-channel stereo set-up.

Some commercial recordings followed:

- Milla Jovovich, The Divine Comedy (1994)
- Gustav Mahler: Symphony No. 9, Benjamin Zander, Philharmonia Orchestra (1999)

The MacRobert Award was presented to Sensaura by the Royal Academy of Engineering in 2001.

Sensaura technology was shipped on more than 24 million game consoles and 150 million PCs (on soundcards, motherboards and external USB audio devices). As well as being licensed directly for the first Microsoft Xbox hardware, the technology was also available as a middleware product, GameCODA, for the Xbox, PlayStation 2, and GameCube. In 2000, Sensaura developed a spatial audio plugin for the WinAmp media player which was downloaded 18 million times.

In December 2003, the Sensaura business and IP portfolio was bought by Creative Technology. Sensaura continued to operate as an R&D division within Creative, however following a major reduction in staff numbers in March 2007, it ceased supplying audio technologies for PC sound cards, game consoles but focused on other product areas, including involvement with the OpenSL ES standard. Following further headcount reductions in 2008, the remaining Sensaura engineers were absorbed into Creative's 3DLabs subsidiary.

Prior to the acquisition of Sensaura by Creative Technology in 2003, some employees left to form Sonaptic Ltd. Licensing Sensaura's technology, Sonaptic specialized in 3D positional audio for mobile devices. In 2007, Wolfson Microelectronics acquired Sonaptic, wanting to expand their reach within the audio market.

== Technology ==
Sensaura's 3D Positional Audio logo

=== Sensaura 3D Positional Audio (S-3DPA) ===
Sensaura's 3D positional audio technology was designed to build upon the industry standard Microsoft DirectSound3D API, which allowed games to have high quality audio in three dimensions.

- HRTF 3D audio positioning with low CPU usage.
- Virtual Ear features common HRTF profiles (libraries) that can be selected by the end-user.
- Digital Ear is a process of tuning HRTF filter libraries to the individual's ear shape by creating a CAD model with physical implementation.
- MacroFX simulates 'near-field proximity effects' when objects move very close to the listener.
- ZoomFX to simulate sounds of a specific size instead of a point source.

=== 3D speaker technology ===
By using MultiDrive 5.1 and XTC cross-talk cancellation, Sensaura's 3D speaker technology can create accurate 3D audio within a normal 5.1 surround sound system.

- XTC cross-talk cancellation for 3D from speakers (as opposed to from headphones).
- Independent HRTF calculation for surround speakers to give full 3D audio from 5.1
- MultiDrive 5.1 integrates front and rear sound hemispheres on 5.1 speaker setups.
- MultiDrive simulates 3D sound on 4 speaker setups

=== gameCODA (audio middleware) ===

For more information, see gameCODA.

== Compatible hardware ==
=== Consoles & PC's (gameCODA) ===
GameCODA is able to run on virtually any x86 PC with basic sound support.

- Personal computers (PC's)
- Microsoft Xbox
- Sony PlayStation 2
- Nintendo GameCube

=== Sound cards (S-3DPA) ===
Sound cards that support S-3DPA can also be utilized to accelerate gameCODA.

The list of hardware below is not exhaustive:

- Audiotrak Prodigy 7.1
- Diamond Monster Sound MX400
- M-audio Revolution 7.1

==== Turtle Beach ====
- Turtle Beach Catalina
- Turtle Beach Santa Cruz

==== Hercules (Guillemot) ====
- Guillemot Maxi Sound Muse
- Hercules Game Theater XP
- Hercules Gamesurround Muse 5.1 DVD
- Hercules Gamesurround Fortissimo III 7.1
- Hercules Digifire 7.1

==== Yamaha YMF7x4 series ====
- YMF724C-V
- YMF724F-V
- YMF730
- YMF738
- YMF744
- YMF744B-R
- YMF754 DS-1E

==== Terratec ====
- Terratec SoundSystem DMX
- Terratec DMX 6Fire
- Terratec DMX XFire 1024
- Terratec Aureon 7.1 Space
- Terratec Aureon 7.1 Universe

=== Motherboards with semiconductors ===
ASUS

- ASUS P4S800 series
- ASUS P4B533-X
- ASUS A7V266-MX
- ASUS A7V8X-X (on audio models only)

=== Semiconductors ===
- Analog Devices Inc: AD1881A, AD1885 (86,87,88), AD1980, AD1985, AD1986A (SoundMAX)
- C-Media: CMI 8768 (SoundPro)
- Realtek: ALC658
- VIA: VT1616, VT1618, (Vinyl Audio, Vinyl Tremor)

== See also ==
- AC'97 (Audio Codec)
- Aureal Semiconductor
- Creative Technology
- GameCODA
- OpenSL ES
- Sound card
- (NVIDIA) SoundStorm
