= Transaural =

Suite of signal processing algorithms

Transaural Stereo is a technology suite of analog circuits and digital signal processing algorithms related to the field of sound playback for audio communication and entertainment. It is based on the concept of crosstalk cancellation, but in some versions can embody other processes such as binaural synthesis and equalization.

The technology was developed in the 1970s by Duane H. Cooper and Jerald L. Bauck.

== Description ==
The central concept behind transaural stereo is that there are two loudspeakers and a single listener (two ears). The left-channel signal should only reach the left ear and the right-channel signal should only reach the right ear, each with appropriate timbral corrections.

To effect this, a circuit or computer algorithm is devised. It is based on the knowledge of the four frequency-dependent transfer functions, the so-called ipsilateral and contralateral paths.:

- L-to-L
- L-to-R
- R-to-L
- R-to-R

These four functions are examples of head-related transfer functions (HRTF).

A more general theory allows arbitrary numbers of loudspeakers and ears (listeners). The inputs to the process are sometimes recorded binaural signals from a recording mannequin ("dummy head"), but this is not a requirement. Virtual loudspeakers can be formed by combining crosstalk cancellation with binaural image synthesis so that, for example, narrowly spaced loudspeakers can be made to sound further apart or a five-channel surround sound system can be made with only two actual loudspeakers, a virtual home theater.

== History ==
transaural stereo was developed by Duane H. Cooper and Jerald L. Bauck. An early version was published as a Master's thesis at the University of Illinois in 1978 and later in the Journal of the Audio Engineering Society. The work was continued in the mid-1980s as an improvement on and practical implementation of the early work in comparative auditoria studies in the 1960s of Schroeder and Atal, which was reported as obtaining unstable images under slight head movements.

Cooper and Bauck, using methods to stabilize images and reduce the filter count, made an analog crosstalk canceller, a two-speaker spreader, and an eight-position binaural image synthesizer which doubled as a binaural pan pot in 1987–1989 using biquadratic analog filters in shuffler configurations. Later implementations used highly efficient digital biquadratic filters.

The distributed source concept with both discrete and continuous source distributions was created in March 1997 and later refined and the refinement named Optimal Source Distribution.
