= Formac Elektronik GmbH =

European PC manufacturer

- Type: Public
- Industry: Semiconductors - Specialized
- Founded: 1989; 37 years ago
- Headquarters: Berlin, Germany
- Products: Graphics Cards
- Website: formac.com

Formac Elektronik GmbH was a European-based manufacturer of various PC devices. Formac was most widely known for its TFT Display range, desktop and portable data storage products, or historically for its advanced Graphics cards and video conversion products.

== Displays ==
Formac sold monitors under their Gallery line, with the first ones being exclusive to Apples Mac line of PCs, due to them being offered with only a ADC connector. The Formac Gallery 2010 and Gallery 1740 from 2002 were the first to be offered in a second version with a DVI connector. In 2004 Formac launched the Gallery Xtreme 1900, which was later also offered with a TFT LCD panel.

== Portable storage ==
Formac sold portable storage since 1990 including in 2006 the Disk Mini, which offered a FireWire 400 connection as well as a USB 2.0 port. A later version only had USB ports and at launch offered up to 250 GB of storage.
