= Duane H. Cooper =

American physicist (1923–1995)

Duane H. Cooper (August 21, 1923 in Gibson City, Illinois – April 4, 1995) was a physicist, who made early investigations regarding the intricate geometry of the phonograph stylus-groove interface.

He earned a Bachelor of Science and Ph.D. degree with honors in physics in 1950 and 1955 from the California Institute of Technology.

In 1954, Cooper joined the Coordinated Sciences Laboratory at the University of Illinois, where he became a research professor. He developed a unified treatment of phonograph tracking and tracing distortion by utilizing a skew transformation. In the late 1960s and early 70s, Cooper contributed significantly to the theory of surround sound multi-channel stereo.

Cooper served as president of the Audio Engineering Society (AES) from 1975-1976. He was named an AES Fellow in 1966, and received the AES Silver and Gold Medals.
