= Aureal Semiconductor =

Defunct American electronics manufacturer

Aureal Semiconductor Inc.
- Type: Public
- Traded as: OTCBB: AURL
- Industry: Audio Technologies
- Predecessor: Media Vision Technology
- Founded: November 9, 1995; 31 years ago
- Defunct: September 21, 2000
- Fate: Bankrupt, dissolved. Assets were acquired by Creative Technology
- Headquarters: Fremont, California
- Key people: Kenneth 'Kip' Kokinakis, (President, CEO); Toni Schneider (VP of technology, 1996-1998; VP of marketing, 1998-2000)
- Subsidiaries: Crystal River Engineering

Aureal Semiconductor Inc. was an American electronics manufacturer, best known throughout the mid-late 1990s for their PC sound card technologies including A3D and the Vortex (a line of audio ASICs.) The company was the reincarnation of the, at the time, bankrupt Media Vision Technology, who developed and manufactured multimedia peripherals such as the Pro Audio Spectrum 16. Aureal went bankrupt in 2000 following a legal battle with Creative Labs, who then acquired the company's assets.

== History ==
In May 1996, Aureal Semiconductor was founded from what previously was Media Vision Technologies Inc. after being involved in a financial scandal that led to then-CEO Paul Jain stepping down. Media Vision incurred in approximately $104 million in aggregate losses in 1995 before the company was renamed.

Aureal sustained further losses of $17 million in 1996 and $18 million in 1997. After having acquired Crystal River Engineering in May 1996, Aureal worked with them to develop and market the A3D audio technology. The technology was incorporated into video games, surround sound systems and sound cards.

On March 5, 1998 Creative Labs sued Aureal for patent infringement. Aureal countersued because they believed Creative was guilty of patent infringement. After numerous lawsuits Aureal won a favorable ruling in December 1999, which vindicated Aureal from these patent infringement claims, but the legal costs were too high and Aureal filed for bankruptcy. On September 21, 2000, Creative acquired Aureal's assets from its bankruptcy trustee for US$32 million through the bankruptcy court, with the specific provision that Creative Labs would be released from all claims of past infringement by Creative Labs upon Aureal's A3D technology. The purchase included patents, trademarks, other property, as well as a release to Creative from any infringement by Creative of Aureal's intellectual property including A3D. The purchase effectively eliminated Creative's only competition in the gaming audio market, and with it any requirements for Creative to pay past or future royalties as well as damages for products which incorporated Aureal's technology.

== Technologies and products ==
Contrary to OEM companies (such as Creative which builds, brands and sells their own devices), Aureal was a fabless semiconductor company. This changed with their final product: the Aureal SuperQuad.

=== Vortex ===
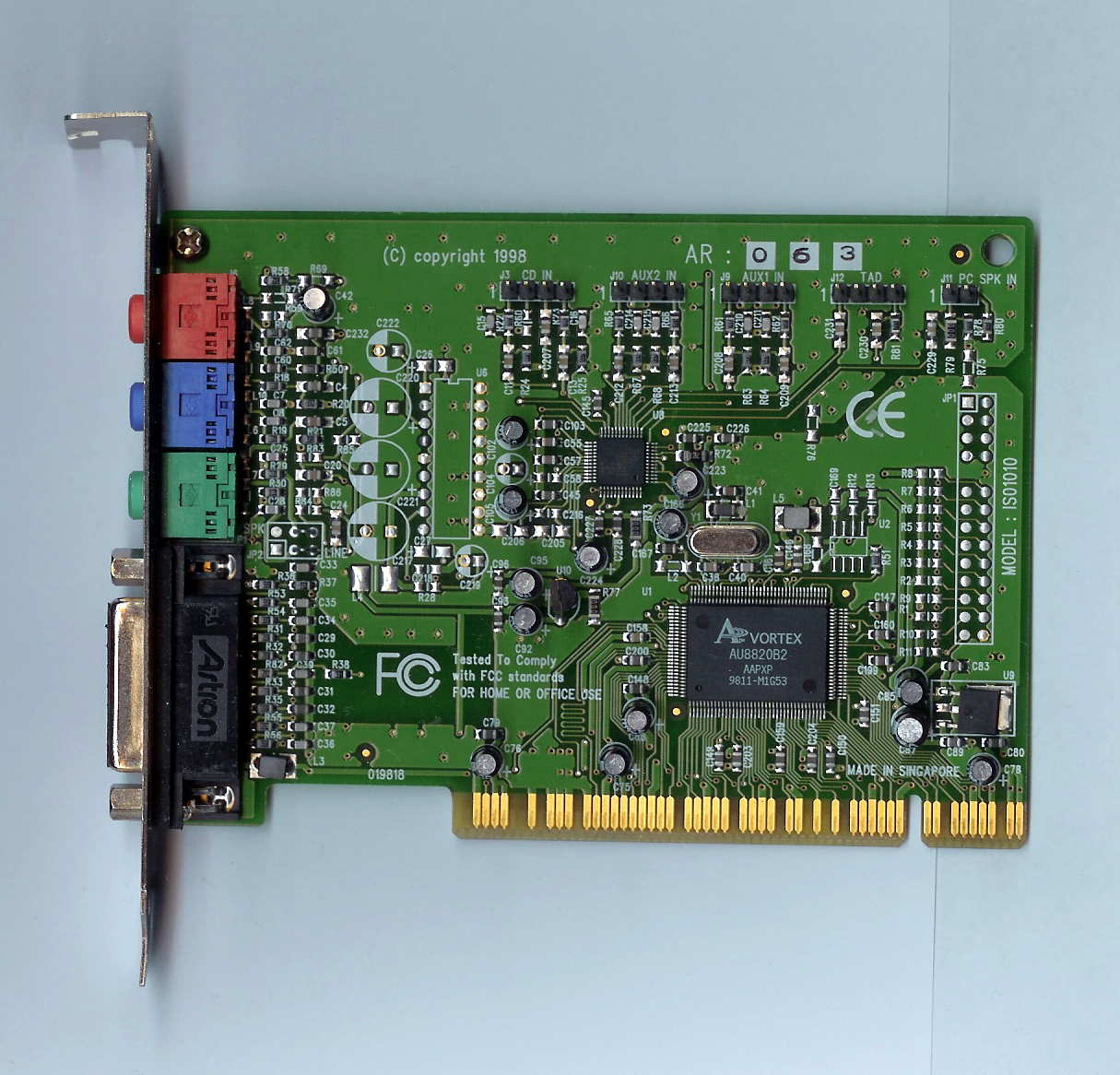
Vortex 1 sound card with AU8820B2-chip

Vortex 2 logo branding

The Vortex audio accelerator chipset line from Aureal Semiconductor was designed to improve performance of their then-popular A3D audio technology. The first member of the line, the Vortex AU8820, was announced on July 14, 1997, and was used in by a number of sound card manufacturers, like Turtle Beach and TerraTec. After Aureal's release of A3D 2.0, the Vortex AU8830 (known as the Vortex 2) was announced on August 6, 1998. The Vortex 2 chipset won numerous industry awards, and was used among other places in the Diamond Monster Sound MX300, which achieved near-cult status with audiophiles and gamers for the high quality of its positional audio.

Near the end of Aureal's existence, they released a Vortex Advantage budget sound card aimed at systems integrators, which ran on the Vortex AU8810 chipset. Towards the end of 1999, the SQ3500 was announced, which ran on the Vortex AU8830 chipset, with the main addition being a new "Turbo DSP" daughter-board module.

All Vortex soundcards are still functional with latest Windows 2000/Windows XP drivers in Windows Vista and Windows 7 (32 bit editions only). While Windows XP supports the 8830 Vortex 2 chipset out of the box, there is an official final beta driver available for it (v5.12.2568.0). There are also modified versions of the XP driver that provide basic audio functionality to Windows Vista and 7. These third-party modified drivers may no longer available.

=== A3D ===
A3D "Interactive" logo

A3D (Aureal 3-Dimensional) is the technology used by Aureal Semiconductor in their Vortex line of PC sound chips to deliver three-dimensional sound through headphones, two or even four speakers. The technology used head-related transfer functions (HRTF), which the human ear interprets as spatial cues indicating the location of a particular sound source. Many modern sound cards and PC games incorporated A3D via license from Aureal. Due to Aureal's acquisition (see below) the A3D technology is now part of the intellectual property of Creative Labs.

The technology was originally developed by Crystal River Engineering for NASA's Virtual Environment Workstation Project (VIEW). Crystal River later commercialized the technology with a series of products including the Convolvotron and the Acoustetron. Aureal acquired Crystal River in May 1996 and rebranded the technology A3D.

A3D differs from various forms of discrete positional audio in that it only requires two speakers, while surround sound typically requires more than four. The particular advantage of A3D is for dynamic or interactive environments such as simulations, games, video conference, and remote learning. A3D is not as effective for static productions such as movies which typically employ surround sound.

A3D uses a subset of the actual in-game 3D world data to accurately model the location of both direct (A3Dspace) and reflected (A3Dverb) sound streams (A3D 2.0 can perform up to 60 first-order reflections). EAX 1.0, the competing technology at the time promoted by Creative Labs, simulated the environment with an adjustable reverb—it didn't calculate any actual reflections off the 3D surfaces.

A3D was supported by 3DMark along with many other software titles of the late 1990s, including Half-Life, Unreal, Quake II, Soldier of Fortune, Jedi Knight, SiN, Quake III Arena (up to version 1.25), Unreal Tournament and Star Trek: Voyager – Elite Force.

Following Aureal Semiconductor's acquisition by Creative, support for the API was discontinued.

== See also ==
- Sensaura
- DirectSound
- HRTF (head-related transfer function)
