= Creative Technology =

Singaporean technology company

Creative Technology Ltd.

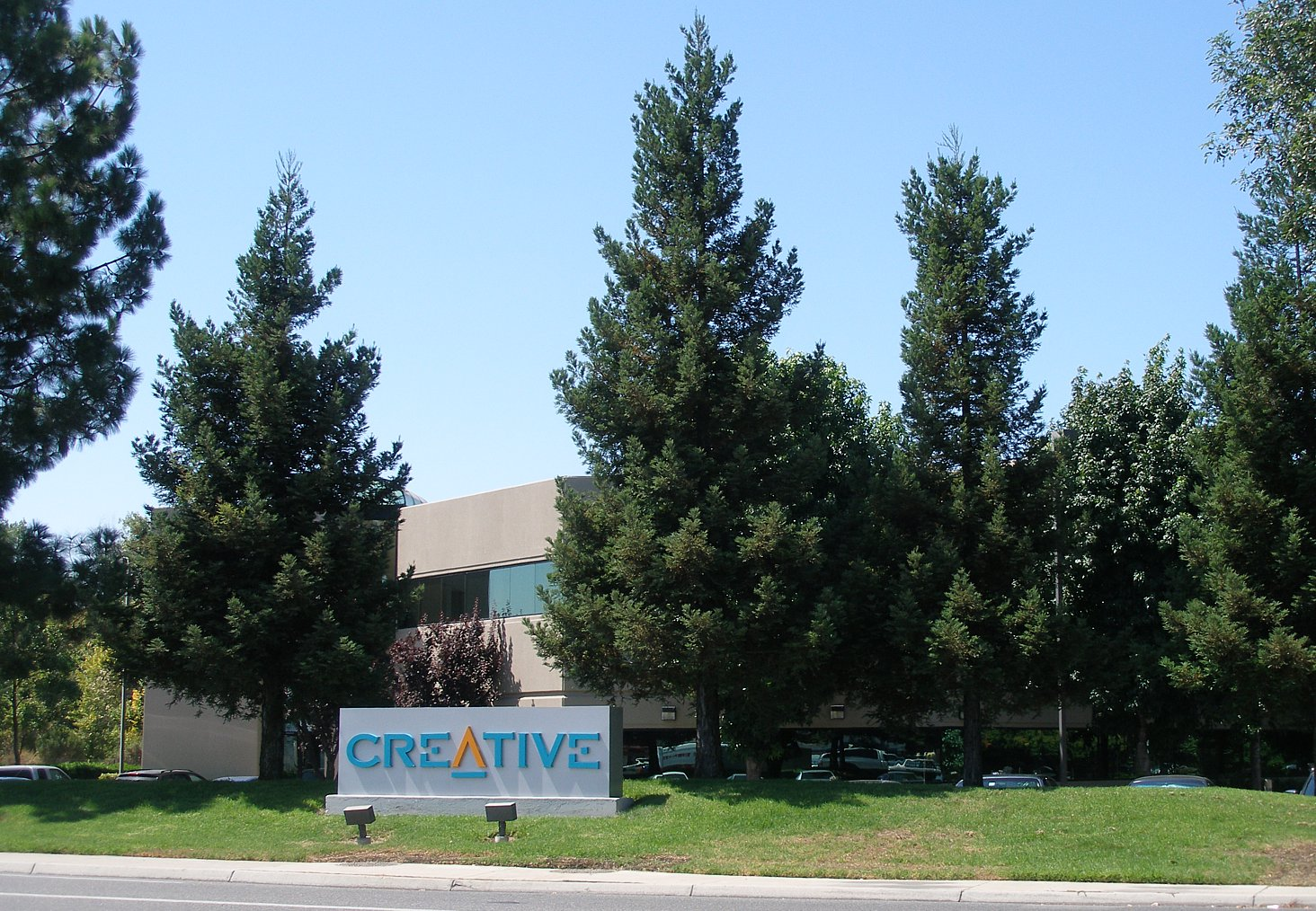
- Creative Labs office in Milpitas, California
- Type: Public
- Traded as: SGX: C76
- Industry: Consumer electronics
- Founded: 1 July 1981; 45 years ago
- Founders: Sim Wong Hoo; Ng Kai Wa; Chay Kwong Soon
- Headquarters: 31 International Business Park Rd, Lobby C, #03-01, Creative Resource, Singapore 609921
- Area served: Worldwide
- Key people: Freddy Sim (CEO); Ng Keh Long (CFO)
- Products: Multimedia, IT, Consumer electronics
- Revenue: ▲US$61.3 million (2022)
- Net income: ▲US$-11 million (2022)
- Number of employees: 800 (2012)
- Subsidiaries: ZiiLABS, 3Dlabs and Sensaura (merged); E-mu Systems and Ensoniq (merged); Cambridge SoundWorks
- Website: www.creative.com

Creative Technology Ltd., or Creative Labs Pte Ltd., is a Singaporean multinational electronics company mainly dealing with audio technologies and products such as speakers, headphones, sound cards and other digital media. Founded by Sim Wong Hoo, Creative was highly influential in the advancement of PC audio in the 1990s following the introduction of its Sound Blaster card and technologies; the company continues to develop Sound Blaster products including embedding them within partnered mainboard manufacturers and laptops.

The company also has overseas offices in Shanghai, Tokyo, Dublin and the Silicon Valley. Creative Technology has been listed on the Singapore Exchange (SGX) since 1994.

== History ==
=== 1981–1996 ===
Creative Technology was founded in 1981 by childhood friends and Ngee Ann Polytechnic schoolmates Sim Wong Hoo and Ng Kai Wa. Originally a computer repair shop in Pearl's Centre in Chinatown, the company eventually developed an add-on memory board for the Apple II computer. Later, Creative spent $500,000 developing the Cubic CT, an IBM-compatible PC adapted for the Chinese language and featuring multimedia features like enhanced color graphics and a built-in audio board capable of producing speech and melodies. With lack of demand for multilingual computers and few multimedia software applications available, the Cubic was a commercial failure.

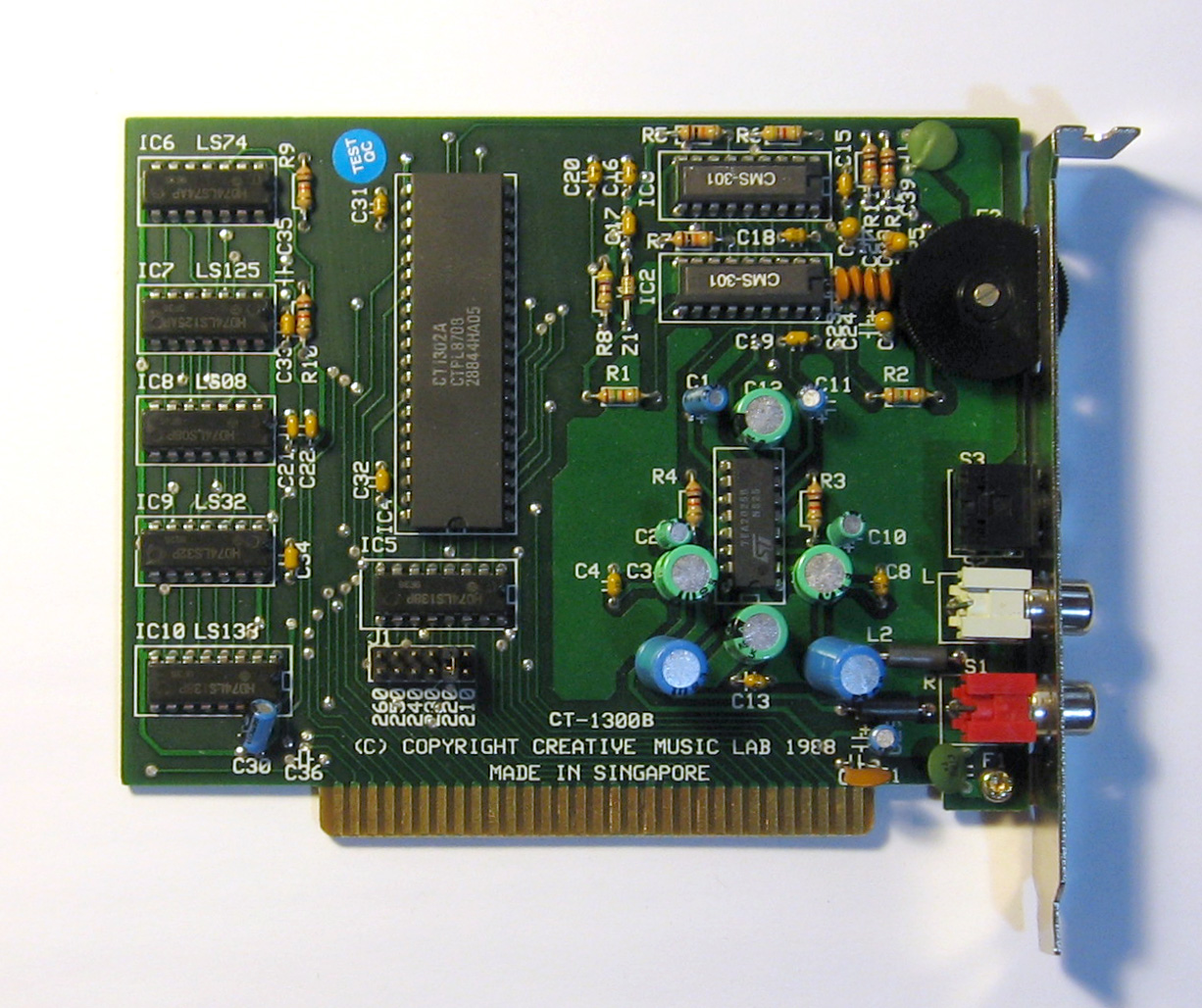
Creative Music System sound card

Shifting focus from language to music, Creative developed the Creative Music System, a PC add-on card. Sim established Creative Labs, Inc. in the United States' Silicon Valley and convinced software developers to support the sound card, renamed Game Blaster and marketed by RadioShack's Tandy division. The success of this audio interface led to the development of the standalone Sound Blaster sound card, introduced at the 1989 COMDEX show just as the multimedia PC market, fueled by Intel's 386 CPU and Microsoft Windows 3.0, took off. The success of Sound Blaster helped grow Creative's revenue from US$5.4 million in 1989 to US$658 million in 1994.

In 1993, the year after Creative's initial public offering, in 1992, former Ashton-Tate CEO Ed Esber joined Creative Labs as CEO to assemble a management team to support the company's rapid growth. Esber brought in a team of US executives, including Rich Buchanan (graphics), Gail Pomerantz (marketing), and Rich Sorkin (sound products, and later communications, OEM and business development). This group played key roles in reversing a brutal market share decline caused by intense competition from Media Vision at the high end and Aztech at the low end. Sorkin, in particular, dramatically strengthened the company's brand position through crisp licensing and an aggressive defense of Creative's intellectual property positions while working to shorten product development cycles.

At the same time, Esber and the original founders of the company had differences of opinion on the strategy and positioning of the company. Esber exited in 1995, followed quickly by Buchanan and Pomerantz. Following Esber's departure, Sorkin was promoted to General Manager of Audio and Communication Products and later Executive Vice-president of Business Development and Corporate Investments, before leaving Creative in 1996 to run Elon Musk's first startup and Internet pioneer Zip2.

By 1996, Creative's revenues had peaked at US$1.6 billion. With pioneering investments in VOIP and media streaming, Creative was well-positioned to take advantage of the Internet era, but ventured into the CD-ROM market and was eventually forced to write off nearly US$100 million in inventory when the market collapsed due to a flood of cheaper alternatives.

=== 1997–2011 ===
The firm had maintained a strong foothold in the ISA PC audio market until 14 July 1997 when Aureal Semiconductor entered the soundcard market with their very competitive PCI AU8820 Vortex 3D sound technology. The firm at the time was in development of their own in house PCI audio cards but were finding little success adopting the PCI standard. In January 1998 in order to quickly facilitate a working PCI audio technology, the firm made the acquisition of Ensoniq for US$77 million. On 5 March 1998 the firm sued Aureal with patent infringement claims over a MIDI caching technology held by E-mu Systems. Aureal filed a counterclaim stating the firm was intentionally interfering with its business prospects, had defamed them, commercially disparaged, engaged in unfair competition with intent to slow down Aureals sales, and acted fraudulently. The suit had come only days after Aureal gained a fair market with the AU8820 Vortex1.

In August 1998, the Sound Blaster Live! was the firm's first sound card developed for the PCI bus in order to compete with upcoming Aureal AU8830 Vortex2 sound chip. Aureal at this time were making fliers comparing their new AU8830 chips to the now shipping Sound Blaster Live!. The specifications within these fliers comparing the AU8830 to the Sound Blaster Live! EMU10K1 chip sparked another flurry of lawsuits against Aureal, this time claiming Aureal had falsely advertised the Sound Blaster Live!'s capabilities.

In December 1999, after numerous lawsuits, Aureal won a favourable ruling but went bankrupt as a result of legal costs and their investors pulling out. Their assets were acquired by Creative through the bankruptcy court in September 2000 for US$32 million. The firm had in effect removed their only major direct competitor in the 3D gaming audio market, excluding their later acquisition of Sensaura.

In April 1999, the firm launched the NOMAD line of digital audio players that would later introduce the MuVo and ZEN series of portable media players. In November 2004, the firm announced a $100 million marketing campaign to promote their digital audio products, including the ZEN range of MP3 players.

The firm applied for U.S. patent 6,928,433 on 5 January 2001 and was awarded the patent on 9 August 2005. The Zen patent was awarded to the firm for the invention of user interface for portable media players. This opened the way for potential legal action against Apple's iPod and the other competing players. The firm took legal actions against Apple in May 2006. In August, 2006, Creative and Apple entered into a broad settlement, with Apple paying Creative $100 million for the licence to use the Zen patent. The firm then joined the "Made for iPod" program.

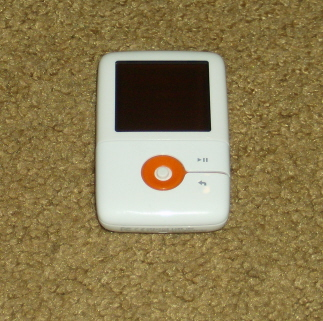
Creative ZEN V digital music player

On 22 March 2005, The Inquirer reported that Creative Labs had agreed to settle in a class action lawsuit about the way its Audigy and Extigy soundcards were marketed. The firm offered customers who purchased the cards up to a $62.50 reduction on the cost of their next purchase of its products, while the lawyers involved in filing the dispute against Creative received a payment of approximately $470,000.

In 2007, Creative voluntarily delisted itself from NASDAQ, where it had the symbol of CREAF. Its stocks are now solely on the Singapore Exchange (SGX-ST).

In early 2008, Creative Labs' technical support centre, located in Stillwater, Oklahoma, US laid off several technical support staff, furthering ongoing concerns surrounding Creative's financial situation. Later that year, the company faced a public-relations backlash when it demanded that a user named "Daniel_K" cease distributing modified versions of drivers for Windows Vista which restored functionality that had been available in drivers for Windows XP. The company deleted his account from its online forums but reinstated it a week later.

In January 2009, the firm generated Internet buzz with a mysterious website promising a "stem cell-like" processor which would give a 100-fold increase in supercomputing power over current technology, as well as advances in consumer 3D graphics. At CES 2009, it was revealed to be the ZMS-05 processor from ZiiLABS, a subsidiary formed from the combining of 3DLabs and Creative's Personal Digital Entertainment division.

=== 2012–present ===
In November 2012, the firm announced it has entered into an agreement with Intel Corporation for Intel to license technology and patents from ZiiLABS Inc. Ltd, a wholly owned subsidiary of Creative, and acquire engineering resources and assets related to its UK branch as a part of a $50 million deal. ZiiLABS (still wholly owned by Creative) continues to retain all ownership of its StemCell media processor technologies and patents, and will continue to supply and support its ZMS series of chips to its customers.

From 2014 to 2017, Creative's revenue from audio products have contracted at an average of 15% annually, due to increased competition in the audio space.

At the Consumer Electronics Show (CES) in Las Vegas in January 2018, its Super X-Fi dongle won the Best of CES 2018 Award by AVS Forum. The product was launched after more than $100 million in investment and garnered positive analyst reports. This new technology renewed interest in the company and likely helped to raise its share price from S$1.25 to S$8.75 within a 2-week period.

The company is still producing Chinese-language and bilingual software for the Singapore market, but nearly half of the company's income is generated in the United States and South America; the European Union represents 32% of revenues, with Asia making the remainder.

On January 4, 2023, Sim died at age 67, with president of Creative Labs Business Unit Song Siow Hui appointed as interim CEO.

On 16 May 2025, it was announced that Freddy Sim, brother of Sim Wong Hoo, was appointed as the new CEO with the interim CEO, Dr Tan Jok Tin, remaining executive chairman.

== Products ==
=== Sound Blaster ===
Creative's Sound Blaster sound card was among the first dedicated audio processing cards to be made widely available to the general consumer. As the first to bundle what is now considered to be a part of a sound card system: digital audio, on-board music synthesizer, MIDI interface and a joystick port, Sound Blaster rose to become a de facto standard for sound cards in PCs for many years. Creative Technology have made their own file format Creative Voice which has the file format .voc.

In 1987 Creative Technology released the Creative Music System (C/MS), a 12-voice sound card for the IBM PC architecture. When C/MS struggled to acquire market share, Sim traveled from Singapore to Silicon Valley and negotiated a deal with RadioShack's Tandy division to market the product as the Game Blaster. While the Game Blaster did not overcome AdLib's sound card market dominance, Creative used the platform to create the first Sound Blaster, which retained CM/S hardware and added the Yamaha YM3812 chip found on the AdLib card, as well as adding a component for playing and recording digital samples. Creative aggressively marketed the "stereo" aspect of the Sound Blaster (only the C/MS chips were capable of stereo, not the complete product) to calling the sound producing micro-controller a "DSP", hoping to associate the product with a digital signal processor (the DSP could encode/decode ADPCM in real time, but otherwise had no other DSP-like qualities). Monaural Sound Blaster cards were introduced in 1989, and Sound Blaster Pro stereo cards followed in 1992. The 16-bit Sound Blaster AWE32 added Wavetable MIDI, and AWE64 offered 32 and 64 voices.

Sound Blaster achieved competitive control of the PC audio market by 1992, the same year that its main competitor, Ad Lib, Inc., went bankrupt. In the mid-1990s, following the launch of the Sound Blaster 16 and related products, Creative Technologies' audio revenue grew from US$40 million to nearly US$1 billion annually.

The sixth generation of Sound Blaster sound cards introduced SBX Pro Studio, a feature that restores the highs and lows of compressed audio files, enhancing detail and clarity. SBX Pro Studio also offers user settings for controlling bass and virtual surround.

=== Creative X-Fi Sonic Carrier ===
The Creative X-Fi Sonic Carrier, launched in January 2016, consists of a long main unit and a subwoofer that houses 17 drivers in an 11.2.4 speaker configuration. It incorporates Dolby Atmos surround processing, and also features Creative's EAX 15.2 Dimensional Audio to extract, enhance and upscale sound from legacy material.

The audio and video engine of the X-Fi Sonic Carrier are powered by 7 processors with a total of 14 cores. It supports both local and streaming video content at up to 4K 60 fps, as well as 15.2 channels of high resolution audio playback.

It also comes with 3 distinct wireless technologies that allow multi-room Wi-Fi, Bluetooth, and a zero-latency speaker-to-speaker link to up to 4 subwoofer units.

=== Other products ===
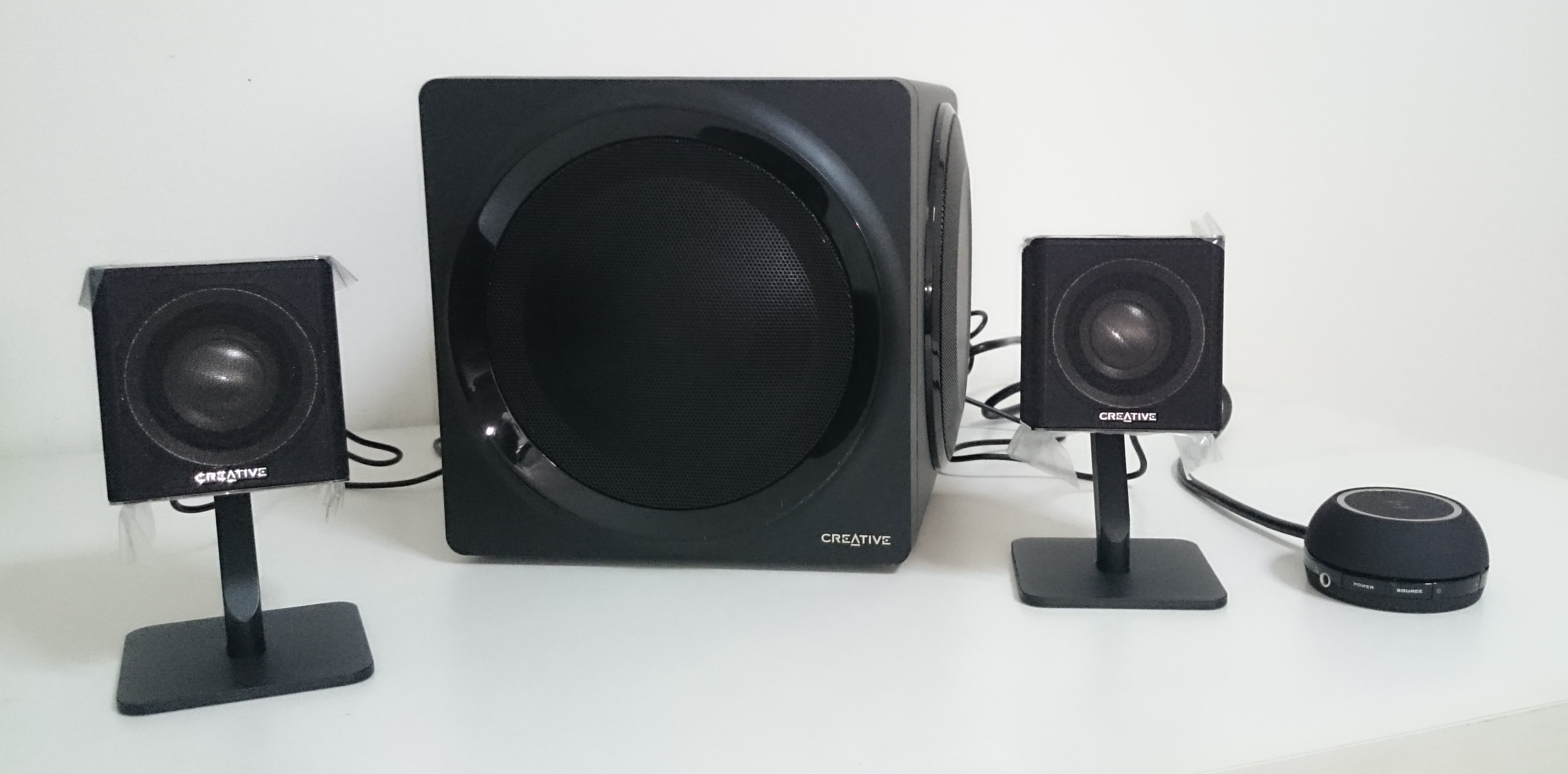
Creative T4 speakers

- Headphones
- Headsets
  - Gaming headsets
- Speakers
  - Computer speakers
  - Portable speakers
  - Creative Wireless Speakers
- Soundbars
- Creative GigaWorks ProGamer G500 speakers

=== Discontinued products ===
- CD and DVD players, drives, and controller cards
- 3D Blaster graphics cards
- 3DO Blaster
- Prodikeys, a computer keyboard/musical keyboard combination
- Optical mice and keyboards
- Vado HD
- Creative Zen and Creative MuVo portable media players

== See also ==
- AdLib
- Aureal Semiconductor
- Ensoniq
- Environmental audio extensions
- Sensaura
- Yamaha

=== Divisions and brands ===
- Cambridge SoundWorks
- Creative MuVo
- Creative NOMAD
- Creative ZEN
- E-mu Systems/Ensoniq
- Sound Blaster
- Sensaura
- SoundFont
- ZiiLABS, formerly 3Dlabs
