= Empeg Car =

Early in-car MP3 player

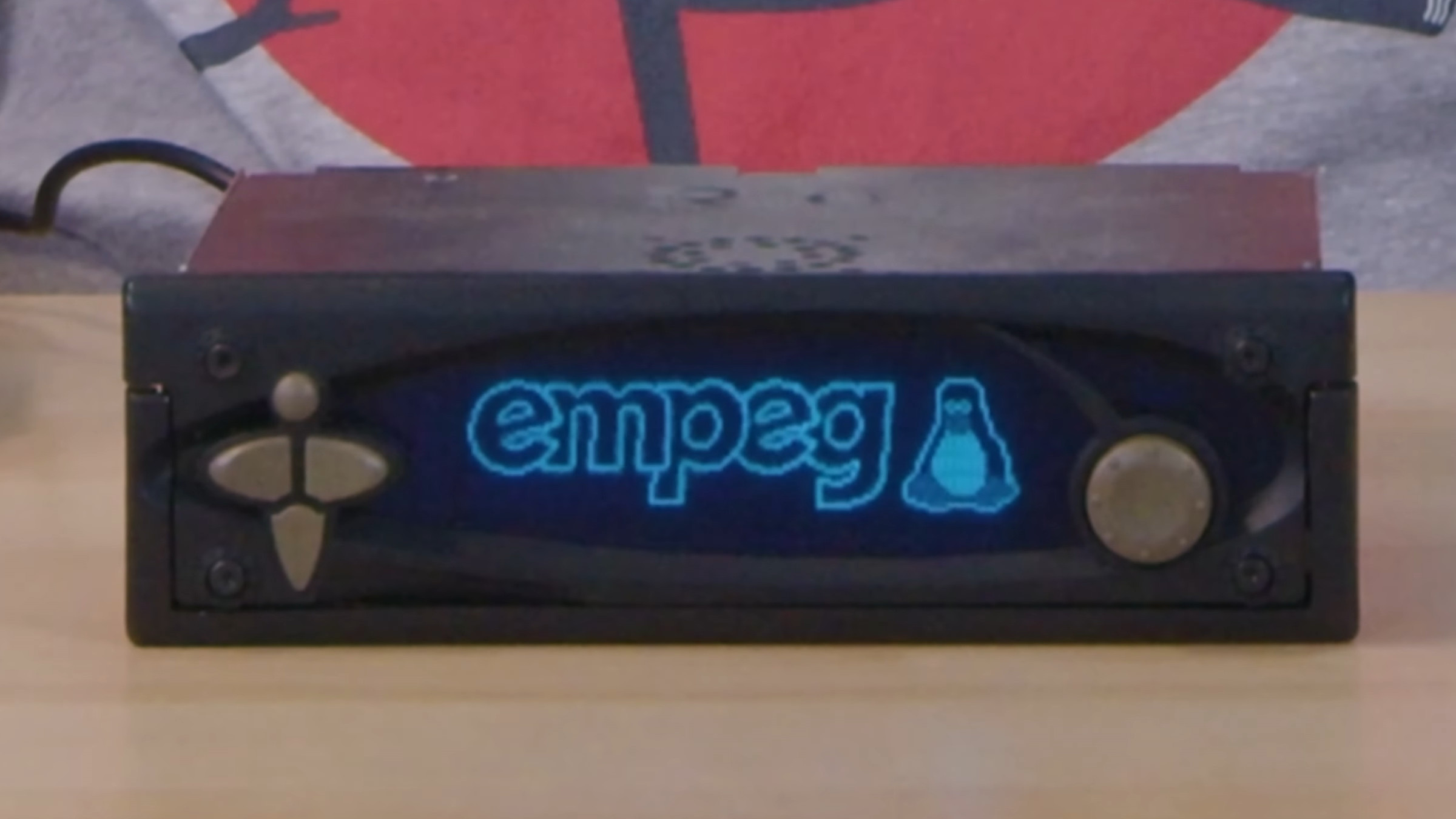
- Also known as: Rio Car (2000–2001)
- Developer: Empeg Ltd
- Manufacturer: Empeg Ltd (1999–2000); SONICblue Incorporated (2000–2001)
- Type: Car stereo
- Release date: August 1999; 26 years ago
- Lifespan: 1999–2001
- Introductory price: US$1,100–2,400
- Discontinued: September 24, 2001; 24 years ago
- Units sold: Fewer than 6,000
- CPU: StrongARM
- Storage: 4–28 GB HDD
- Display: Vacuum fluorescent display
- Sound: Stereophonic

The Empeg Car was one of the first in-car MP3 players developed. Originating in a personal project to build an in-car system that could perform MP3 playback in software, a British company called Empeg Ltd was formed in July 1998 to build a commercial version of the concept, this becoming available for sale in August 1999.

Although the original project employed an embedded PC board from Advantech running a Linux-based operating system, employing a 150 MHz Cyrix processor that was later upgraded to a 166 MHz Pentium, the Empeg Car was built around a system employing a StrongARM processor. (Note: The Mark 2 player used the SA-1100-DA variant, according to the user guide.) Transfer of MP3 tracks to the player was facilitated by the provision of USB, Ethernet, and serial port connections. Initial production was limited to 400 units, after which the "mark II" version of the product, suitable for larger scale production, was to be offered from late 2000 onwards at an estimated starting price of around £900.

Prices started at $1,100 US for the 4GB version, reaching up to $2,400 for a 28GB unit that utilized two laptop drives (which was considered very large capacity at the time). The Empeg Car garnered quite a following and became beloved among the small group of users who bought one.

SONICblue - the former S3 company that had already acquired both the Rio line of MP3 portables by purchasing Diamond and the Rave-MP line by purchasing Sensory Science - took notice of the unit and decided the Empeg Car would fit into its plans. On November 1, 2000 Empeg was acquired by SONICblue Incorporated and the unit was renamed the Rio Car. The original British development team was rolled into the company and eventually took responsibility for all audio software development at SONICblue.

Unfortunately, SONICblue did not have a clear game plan with how to promote the Rio Car. Rio did little to market it and soon left it to languish. Despite their owners' strong devotion to the product, sales of new units were modest and on September 24, 2001 SONICblue discontinued the line. Fewer than 6000 players were ever produced.

Most of the resources, including people, code, and design work, behind the Empeg Car went into the following products:

- Rio Receiver - Network enabled client for streaming music off a computer to anywhere in the home
- Rio Central - A home stereo component that ripped CDs to MP3s and stored them on an internal hard drive. Supported Rio Receivers as clients.
- Rio Karma - Portable 20gb music player

SONICblue went bankrupt in 2003, but the Rio division was purchased by D&M Holdings. The former Empeg employees still with Rio went on to produce the Rio Karma, the Rio Carbon, and several recent flash memory players. In 2005, D&M sold all of their audio player technology to SigmaTel, including all of the Empeg technology, and all of the patents, source code, and designs related to the Rio audio players. The former Empeg employees as well as other Rio technical employees are now employed by SigmaTel at their Austin, TX offices.
