= Rio Carbon =

Line of digital audio players

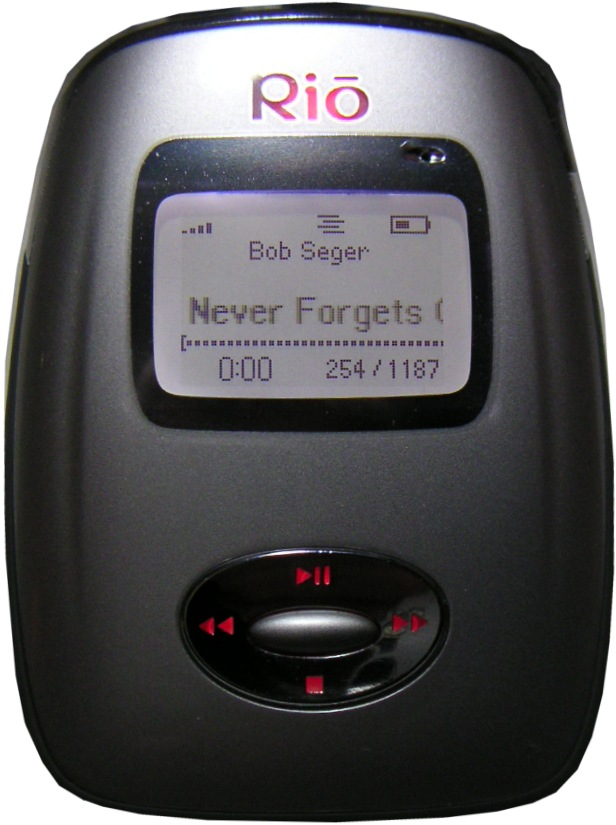
- Rio Carbon 5GB model
- Developer: Rio
- Released: August 2, 2004
- Availability: 2004-2005
- Storage: 5-6 GB Microdrive

The Rio Carbon is a line of digital audio players that was produced by the now defunct Rio from 2004 to 2005. It was similar in size, capacity, and cost with Apple's iPod Mini which debuted earlier the same year. This was Rio's second player to use a miniature hard disk for storage, after the Rio Nitrus, which was first to market with a 1.5 GB drive in late 2003.

== History ==
Rio Avalon unreleased model

The Carbon was announced on August 2, 2004.

The first 500 Carbons were produced as a Limited Edition with a unique serial number (1-500) that was laser engraved into the polished steel (back) side of the player.

The initial Carbon was silver with a 5 GB drive and retailed US$249.99, same as the iPod Mini with 4 GB. An off-white version called the Carbon Pearl was next, with a 5GB drive at first and then a 6 GB drive later as the price of Microdrives fell. This was followed by the 2.5 GB ce2100 (black) and ce2110 (light green) which offered reduced features and cost. An 8 GB model with a colour screen was planned, code-named Avalon, but was never produced due to the demise of Rio in August 2005.

Rio officially exited the portable music player market in August 2005 and is no longer providing firmware updates for the players. The last officially released version of the firmware (1.95) supports subscription-based and purchased PlaysForSure licenses.

A previously unreleased version of Rio Carbon firmware, called "The Developer's Cut", was released in January 2006 by enthusiasts, and offers several new and updated features.

== Features ==
The Carbon features a microphone and a bidirectional wheel, which is used for scrolling and adjusting volume, along with a 5-way navigation pad. It is small in size (82 x 61 x 13 millimeters) and weigh 3.2 ounces, and is powered by a non-removable rechargeable lithium ion battery that has up to 20 hours of playback time.

The wheel is notched. Either the 5-way navigation pad or the scroll wheel and the menu button can be used independently to navigate through menus or they can be used together. The two have different behaviors, and are therefore complementary, not redundant. Since the wheel is used for navigation as well as volume control, one must leave the menu to adjust the volume.

The Carbon can play MP3 and WMA audio files as well as Audible.com audiobook files. It is Microsoft Windows, Linux and Macintosh compatible, since it is usable as a USB mass storage device. It is also PlaysForSure compatible.

Other features include:

- 5 GB of storage on a 1" microdrive
- 5-band equalizer with several presets
- Built-in microphone for voice recording
- USB mass storage device compatible, allowing for simple drag-and-dropping of files
- Built-in rechargeable battery offers up to 20 hours music playback
- Charge from the USB port or the included power adapter
- Windows and Mac compatible (the player itself is Linux compatible as well, but not the included software)
- Includes Rio Music Manager software to manage the digital music library
- Can carry non-audio files like a USB flash drive

== Included software ==
Included with the purchase of the Rio Carbon and Rio Karma is Rio Music Manager, which can be used to transfer music to the Carbon. It only allows transfer of music files that are totally compatible with the player.

== Carbonising ==
The Carbon, at the time of its release, had the unique distinction of costing less than one of its own components, its hard disk drive. This distinction led to an activity known by the slang term "carbonising," whereby customers purchase a Rio Carbon, only to dismantle it and sell the disk drive for a net profit.

== ce2100/2110 ==
The Rio ce2100 is a relative of the Carbon that features a 2.5 GB hard drive. The ce2100 (sometimes mistakenly referred to as the ce2500), does not have a microphone, but retains the microphone hole since it shares the same case as the Carbon. The ce2100 comes in black. The green version has model number ce2110, the only difference being the color of the plastic piece on the front and its limited retail availability (Target and FYE stores only). The ce2100 is also compatible with the "Developer's Cut" firmware update.

== Firmware ==
- Version 3.04 supports both MTP and MSC connections.

== CF Modding ==
The Rio Carbon, along with all of Rio's Microdrive-based players, can be modified to run on Compact Flash cards instead of hard disk. This requires a partial disassembly of the unit, removing the Microdrive, replacing it with a compatible CF card, and then formatting the memory and loading the device firmware. Compatible CF cards must be 8GB or less, and must have TrueATA/TrueIDE mode capability. This mod will increase speed and responsiveness of the player, along with making it more durable and increasing battery life. The 8GB limit is due to the 24-bit addressing in the firmware.

== See also ==
- Trekstor Vibez
- Rio Karma
- Empeg Car
