= RCA Lyra =

Series of portable audio players

RCA Lyra / Thomson Lyra
- Developer: Thomson (1999–2008); Voxx International (2008–2009)
- Type: Digital audio players
- Lifespan: 1999–2009

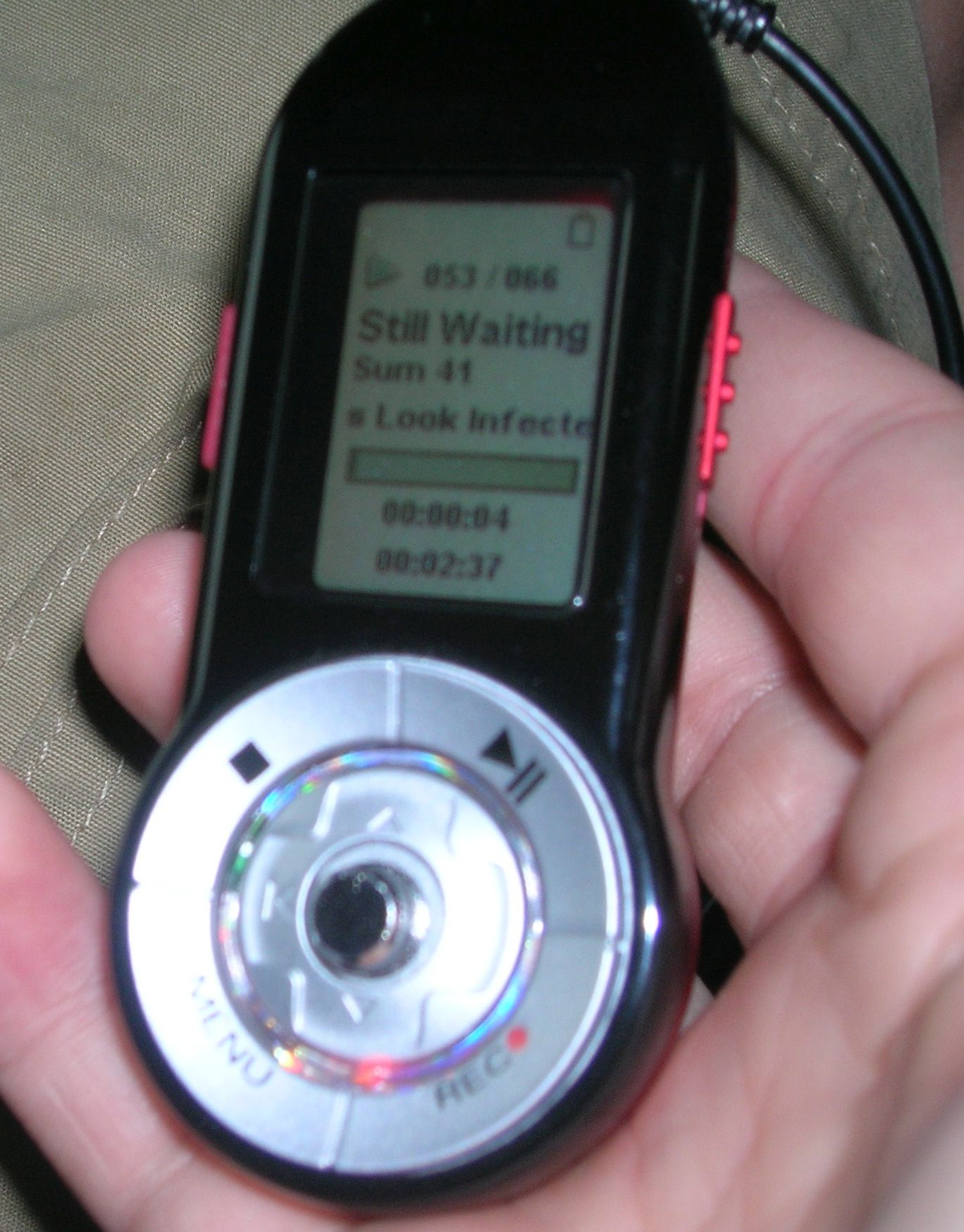
RCA Lyra RD2312

Lyra is a series of MP3 and portable media players (PMP). Initially it was developed and sold by Indianapolis-based Thomson Consumer Electronics Inc., a part of Thomson Multimedia, from 1999 under its RCA brand in the United States and under the Thomson brand in Europe. There were also RCA/Thomson PMPs without the Lyra name, such as the RCA Kazoo (RD1000), RCA Opal and RCA Perl. In January 2008, Thomson sold its Consumer Electronics part including the RCA brand and Lyra line to AudioVox. RCA-branded PMPs are still being made today in its domestic market but no longer under the Lyra name. The Lyra was an early pioneer in digital audio players, although in later years most of its output were ODM products.

== Players ==
=== Lyra (RD2201/RD2204) ===
The RCA Lyra RD2201

The first ever Lyra was released in 1999 as a CompactFlash (CF) based player. It was sold in two models: the RD2201 with a 32 MB CF card ($199.99 list price), and the RD2204 (sold as the Thomson PDP2201 outside the U.S.) with 64 MB CF card ($249.99 list price). It was the first MP3 player that could be updated through software downloads. The Lyra was developed in partnership between Thomson Multimedia and RealNetworks - it has integration with the RealJukebox Windows software and, alongside encrypted MP3, can also play Real's G2 format audio files. A later firmware also allows WMA format playback.

It has a 1" × 3/4", 6-line, backlit monochrome display which at that time (1999-2000) was relatively large. It has a software based five band graphic equalizer, and an external power jack. This series of players requires a proprietary CF reader used in conjunction with specific media players in Windows in order to write files to the card. A supported setup would take a blank CF card, recognize the correct reader attached to the PC, and then while syncing songs to the device, convert them to an encrypted version of RealAudio, MP3, MP3Pro, and later WMA format that is unrecognizable to any other device. It also drops a folder title 'Pmp' onto the root level of the device, which contains the boot image, a config file, and one or more executable, wma.exe, mp3.exe, or rlm.exe. Modified versions of the wma.exe program have been made, capable of playing unencrypted WMA files. This can be used in conjunction with a non-certified CF reader, making the device usable again to anyone who lost theirs and cannot acquire a new one. The only requirement then is to convert the MP3 files to WMA using any number of free converters.

The device also supports much larger CF cards than it original shipped with, up to at least 512 MB. At these sizes though, boot time becomes significantly long, as the Lyra scans the entire card before presenting any menu. With only 250 MB of files, spread across roughly 100 tracks, this can be over a minute. The 2201 also supports custom splash screens via third-party software. The RCA logo can be replaced by overwriting the screen.bit file in the Pmp folder. An updated version, the RD2204A, sold with a 64 MB CF card, can support CF cards up to at least 2 GB. Like the RD2201A, boot times increase with the size of the card. The RD2204A can also be used with a third-party CF reader, provided that the user installs the RCA software on the PC.

=== Lyra2 (RD2211) ===
The Lyra2, released in 2001, has a new design and the addition of an FM radio. It was sold with a 64 MB CompactFlash card. It has a newer, faster external CF reader that now uses the USB interface instead of the parallel port. It no longer comes with RealJukebox software but instead with Music Match Jukebox 6.0. Market rivals of the Lyra2 were the likes of Creative Nomad II and Rio 600/800.

=== Lyra Jukebox ===
The first Lyra Jukebox model (RD2800) was released in mid-2002. It cost $250. It competed against Creative Nomad Jukebox 3, the Apple iPod, and the Rio Riot. A variant was the RD2820 and later an update called RD2821 was released. Another player was the 20 GB RD2826. This player (along with many others) would come bundled with Musicmatch Jukebox software.

The Lyra Mini-Jukebox was a small hard drive player with 1.5 GB space.

The Jukebox HD (RD2840) was released in 2003 with a 40 GB hard disk. It has a 5-line monochrome LCD.

==== Micro Jukebox ====
With a 1 inch hard drive, the Micro Jukebox RD2760/PDP2810 introduced at CES 2003 is a small compact player but with 1.5 GB space. It has an 8-line backlit display.

The later Micro Jukebox was released in 2004 with an internal 1.8" hard disk with 4 GB (RD2762) or 5 GB (RD2763FM) space. It also has a rechargeable Li-ion battery.

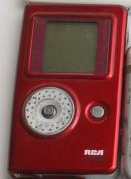
RCA Lyra RD2765

After this the RCA RD2765/Thomson PDP2812 was released with 5 GB memory and a color display.

==== A/V Jukebox ====
One of the popular Lyra products was the A/V Jukebox (RCA RD2780 and Thomson PDP-2860). Introduced at CES 2003, it was also one of the first portable media players capable of playing MPEG-4 encoded videos. The device has a 3.5 inch display and was manufactured having a hard drive with a maximum capacity of 20 GB but could also work with a 60 GB hard drive which had to be installed manually. Battery life was reported to last for up to 3 hours of video and 6 hours of audio playback.

One of the more popular features of this digital audio player was its ability to record live television through the RCA ports on a television set. The player's LCD had a resolution of 320×240 pixels with 16 million colors. It was also possible to view photos on the display screen while audio was playing. The PDP-2860 was also UMS-capable, meaning that it could act as a portable external harddrive with no additional software or driver installation.

=== RD1080 and RD1090 ===
The small, compact RD1080 was released in 2002 and has a blue backlit LCD and built-in FM radio. It has 128 MB flash memory built-in but has a SD/MMC slot for expansion. In 2003, the RD1090 was released with 256 MB space.

=== RD1021/1071/1075 ===
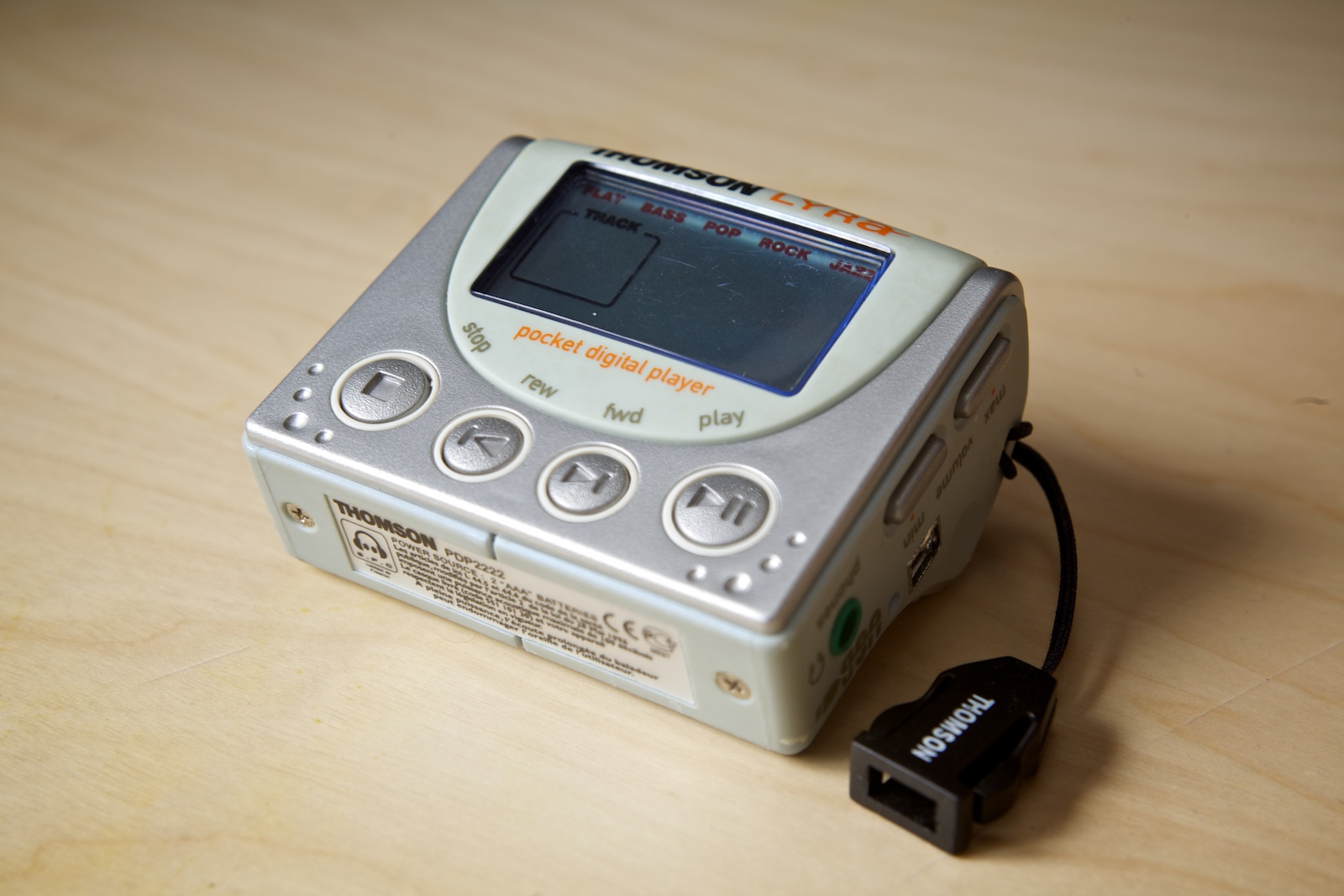
Thomson Lyra PDP2222

These compact sized players with aluminium finishes were released in 2003. They have SD/MMC card slots for expansion. The RD1021 has 64 MB integrated flash memory while the RD1071 has 128 MB and RD1075 has 256 MB.

=== RD1022/1028/1072/1076/1077 ===
The new series of compact sized players, released in 2005.

=== RD2010, RD2110 and RD2210 series ===
The RCA Lyra RD2010 series (RD2010/2011/2012/2015) was released in 2004.

RD2112/2115/2117 are small splash-proof, sports-oriented music players. The RD2210/2212/2215/2217 include a calorie counter, pulse rate monitor and stopwatch.

=== Portable Multimedia Player/Recorder ===
The RCA Lyra X2400 is a portable audio/video recorder and player with a 3.5" LCD screen released around 2006. It has a CompactFlash slot, audio out, built-in speaker and RCA A/V inputs. Recorded video is compressed with an Xvid encoder. The included software, Blaze Media Encoder, can transcode from most popular video and audio formats.

The Lyra X3000 from 2006 cost $399 and featured a 3.6" screen. It has a 20 GB hard drive. It is PlaysForSure certified.

The Lyra X3030 features a 30 GB hard drive with support for many audio and video formats. Included is a DivX encoder which can translate most video formats into smaller more efficient formats. There is no provision to randomly play video clips, as the user may wish to do for a music video jukebox. The DivX converter gives its output file with the .divx extension, which the Lyra rejects as incompatible. However, all the user has to do is rename the file with a .avi extension to make it work. The first documentation to be shipped spoke of a system tray resident icon and program to manage the device. No such software exists in the distribution, and they have since revised their documentation to remove all mention of it.

=== M20 series ===
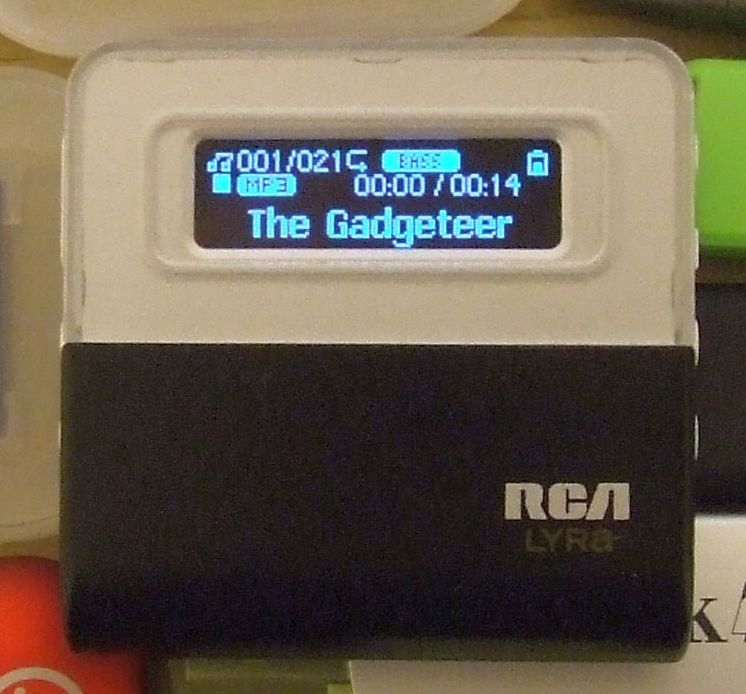
RCA Lyra (M20 series)

This player includes an SD card slot and an FM radio tuner. Models are: M200 (256 MB), M2000 (512 MB), M2001 (1 GB), 512 MB (M2030).

=== H100 series ===
These Microdrive players were released in 2006. They are the H100 (4 GB), the H106 (6 GB) and H116 (6 GB) models.

=== Lyra Slider ===
Under Audiovox ownership, the Slider was introduced in 2008. This PMP has a sliding mechanism, a 2.4" LCD and 8 GB storage. Another version with 4 GB was also made. In 2009 the SL5016 model was released with 16 GB space. After this, Audiovox dropped the Lyra name and started producing players as just RCA.

== Sales and market share ==
In the fourth quarter of 2002 in the United States market, RCA was the biggest selling vendor for MP3 players with a 12.95% market share.

As of August 2004 in the United States market, RCA had a 9% share among both flash and hard disk portable media players, ranking it fourth behind Apple, Rio and iRiver.
