= Rio PMP300 =

Portable consumer MP3 digital audio player

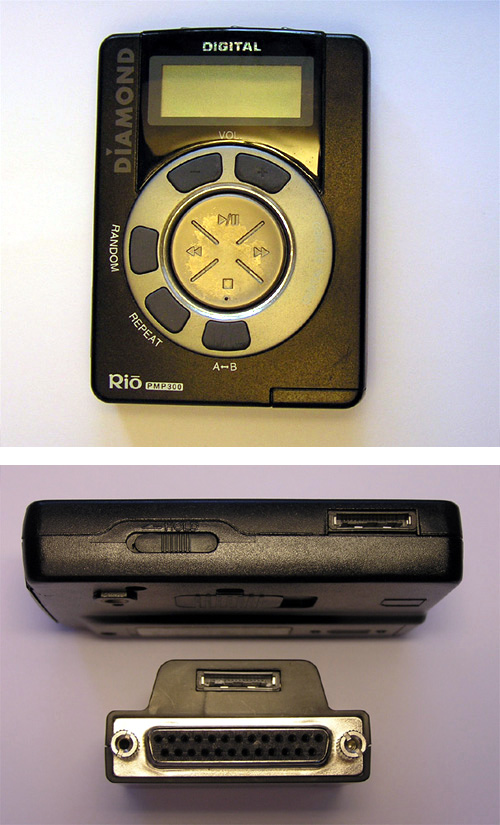
The Rio PMP-300 portable MP3 player. The top view shows the face of the player. The bottom view shows the edge of the player (including its proprietary connector) and the included parallel-port adaptor.

The Rio PMP300 is one of the first portable consumer MP3 digital audio players, and the first commercially successful one. Produced by Diamond Multimedia, it was introduced September 15, 1998 as the first in the "Rio" series of digital audio players, and it shipped later that year.

== Features ==
Roughly the dimensions of a deck of cards (3.5 inches by 2.5 inches and 0.625 inches thick), the Rio is black, and features an LCD screen and a circular pad with control buttons. The device has controls for skipping tracks forwards or backwards, repeat, random play and four preset equalizer settings. The LCD displays the track number being played and the track play time. It can play MP2 and MP3 format audio files, and has support for a variety of bitrates, including MP3 variable-bitrate (VBR) support.

It shipped with 32 MB of internal memory and has a SmartMedia slot, allowing users to add additional memory. It is powered by a single AA battery, which provides between 8 and 12 hours of playback time. Connection to a personal computer is through the computer's parallel port, with a proprietary connector on the Rio's edge.

The Rio retailed for US $200 with the ability to hold around 30 minutes of music at a bitrate of 128 kbit/s. An upgraded version was later released, which is colored translucent green and equipped with a larger 64 MB internal memory, at a cost of $250. The Rio also spawned one of the first Digital Music service providers (ASP or SaaS Cloud Service), RioPort. RioPort was the first digital music service to license secure, single-track commercial downloads from major record labels.

The Rio PMP300 was supplied with a copy of the "Music Match" software for managing the user's MP3 library. A selection of folk/country/blues MP3s were also provided, the metadata for which was in a Music Match specific format rather than as ID3 tags.

=== Design flaws ===
The Rio PMP300 suffered from a few design flaws. The battery compartment door flap is notorious for breaking. The battery cover is difficult to repair due to the stress caused by the spring-loaded battery compartment and the fragile plastic used for the door clips. The metal hinge used to hold the compartment to the base of the unit would put strain on the plastic casing, causing cracks around the SmartMedia slot. The silver colored coating on the main central control button in the original 32 MB unit would often peel and flake off with use. The control disc would commonly fall off.

== Legal disputes ==
On October 8, 1998, the Recording Industry Association of America, filed suit and asked for a temporary restraining order to prevent the sale of the Rio player in the Central District Court of California, claiming the player violated the 1992 Audio Home Recording Act.

Judge Andrea Collins issued the temporary order on October 16, but required the RIAA to post a $500,000 bond that would be used to compensate Diamond for damages incurred in the delay if Diamond eventually prevailed in court. Diamond then announced that it would temporarily delay shipment of the Rio.

On October 26, Judge Collins denied the RIAA's application. On appeal, the Ninth Circuit held that the Rio's space shifting was fair use and not a copyright infringement.

After the lawsuit ended, Diamond sold 200,000 players.

== Software support ==
Diamond no longer provides support for the Rio, and the last version of Microsoft Windows to work with Diamond's Rio software was Windows 98. Independently produced freeware programs such as "Dreaming of Brazil" or "RIOsitude" can still be used to upload audio files to the player. Similarly, limited Linux command-line based support for the Rio is provided by the "rioutils" package.

== Rivals ==
Market rivals of the Diamond Rio included the original RCA Lyra and the Creative Nomad.

== See also ==
- Eiger Labs MPMan F10 – the first portable MP3 player
