= Rio Forge =

Digital audio player

RioForge
- All three flavors of RioForge MP3/FM player. The unit in upper left is in Menu mode, the others are playing back music.
- Manufacturer: Rio Audio, Inc.
- Type: Digital audio player
- Released: July 2004
- Media: MP3, WMA, Audible
- Memory: Flash memory
- Storage: 128, 256, or 512 MB built-in, up to 4GB more with MMC or SD 1.0 (non-SDHC) card
- Connectivity: USB mass storage device
- Power: AAA cell, NiMH or alkaline
- Predecessor: Rio Cali

The RioForge is a digital audio player that was produced by Rio Audio, Inc. While it competed in the same market as Apple Inc's iPod mini, it is considerably different as it plays from internal memory, SD card, or FM broadcast and runs on a single AAA battery.

There are three main models with either 128, 256, or 512 MB of internal flash memory, which can be supplemented with a single MMC or SD (non-SDHC) flash memory card to add up to 4GB of storage. Available colors included blue (512mb), silver (256mb), and red (128mb). The player is one of the few which is light enough to wear with an armband.

A RioForge can play MP3, WMA, and Audible audio files, and can receive FM broadcast signals. All except the 128mb model can record from the FM tuner to memory. It is Microsoft Windows, Linux, and Macintosh compatible since it is usable as a USB mass storage device. The included management software runs on Windows and Mac.

The Rio se510 is a 512MB Forge variant without an MMC/SD memory slot nor an FM tuner, with a light blue case.

D&M Holdings, Inc., which owns the Rio brand, announced its exit from the portable MP3 market on August 26, 2005.

== Features ==
- Up to 4.5 gigabytes of storage with optional 4GB SD card.
- 5-Band equalizer with several presets
- Plays MP3, WMA, Audible, and FM broadcast
- Built-in mini USB connector
- Mounts as USB mass storage device with a drive letter; users can drag and drop data and music files onto the player in Windows Explorer or included software
- Runs on single AAA NiMH or alkaline battery offering up to 20 hours music playback

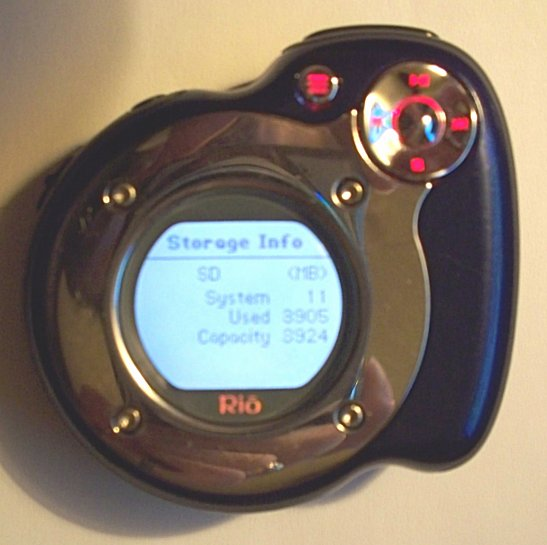
RioForge in the Storage Info menu, displaying 3924MB (4GB) SD card storage capacity

- Windows and Mac compatible (the player itself is Linux compatible as well, but not the software)
- Includes Rio Music Manager software, used to manage the digital music library
- Audiobook support:
  - Playlists - can be used to play the files in an audiobook in the correct order
  - Bookmarks - allow the listener to return later to the exact playlist/track/time in the audiobook

== Firmware Upgrades ==
The firmware on any RioForge can be easily upgraded with the Rio firmware upgrade utility. To complete the firmware upgrade, plug the unit into the USB port of your computer, then run the utility to upgrade the RioForge. This 2-minute procedure will fix any software related reliability issues that were present in older firmware.

Firmware revisions:

- v1.33 and older: If the version of firmware is older than v1.33 (released in July 2005), the player could lock software-activated controls from operating. The solution is to reset the player with this procedure: remove the battery and let the internal capacitors discharge for several minutes, then connect to a PC by the USB cable and reinstall the firmware. The issue is gone in post-July 2005 firmware.
- v1.66: This unofficial version adds MTP (Media Transfer Protocol) support.
- v3.04: This unofficial version, named "The Developers Cut", adds several new features such as large SD card support, and proper support for bookmarks with VBR (Variable Bitrate) .mp3 files. There are no known issues with this version. See external links section below.

== Reliability issues ==
RioForge units suffer from a design flaw where the case-mounted controls operate switches which are surface-mounted on the internal PCB. If the player becomes damaged, taking either out of tolerance, the control (usually the volume) will not operate. An option for players with volume control failure is to use headphones with an in-line volume control.
