= Audio Home Recording Act =

1992 act that amended United States copyright law

- Other short titles: Audio Home Recording Act of 1992
- Long title: To amend title 17, United States Code, to implement a royalty payment system and a serial copy management system for digital audio recording, to prohibit certain copyright infringement actions, and for other purposes.
- Acronyms (colloquial): AHRA
- Nicknames: Audio Home Recording Act of 1992
- Enacted by: the 102nd United States Congress
- Effective: October 28, 1992

Citations
- Public law: 102-563
- Statutes at Large: 106 Stat. 4237

Codification
- Acts amended: Copyright Act of 1976
- Titles amended: 17 U.S.C.: Copyrights
- U.S.C. sections created: 17 U.S.C. ch. 10 § 1001 et seq.

Legislative history
- Introduced in the Senate as S. 1623 by Dennis DeConcini (D-AZ) on August 1, 1991; Committee consideration by Senate Judiciary, Subcommittee on Patents, Copyrights and Trademarks; Passed the Senate on June 17, 1992 (passed voice vote); Passed the House on September 22, 1992 (passed without objection) with amendment; Senate agreed to House amendment on October 7, 1992 (agreed voice vote); Signed into law by President George H. W. Bush on October 28, 1992

The Audio Home Recording Act of 1992 (AHRA) amended the United States copyright law by adding Chapter 10, "Digital Audio Recording Devices and Media". The act enabled the release of recordable digital formats such as Sony's Digital Audio Tape without fear of contributory infringement lawsuits.

The RIAA and music publishers, concerned that consumers' ability to make perfect digital copies of music would destroy the market for audio recordings, had threatened to sue companies and had lobbied Congress to pass legislation imposing mandatory copy protection technology and royalties on devices and media.

The AHRA establishes a number of important precedents in US copyright law that defined the debate between device makers and the content industry for the ensuing two decades. These include:

- the first government technology mandate in the copyright law, requiring all digital audio recording devices sold, manufactured or imported in the US (excluding professional audio equipment) to include the Serial Copy Management System (SCMS).
- the first anti-circumvention provisions in copyright law, later applied on a much broader scale by the Digital Millennium Copyright Act.
- the first government-imposed royalties on devices and media, a portion of which is paid to the record industry directly.

The act also includes blanket protection from infringement actions for private, non-commercial analog audio copying, and for digital audio copies made with certain kinds of digital audio recording technology.

== History and legislative background ==
By the late 1980s, several manufacturers were prepared to introduce read/write digital audio formats to the United States. These new formats were a significant improvement over the newly introduced read-only (at the time) digital format of the compact disc, allowing consumers to make perfect, multi-generation copies of digital audio recordings. Most prominent among these formats was Digital Audio Tape (DAT), followed in the early 1990s by Philips' Digital Compact Cassette (DCC) and Sony's Minidisc.

DAT was available as early as 1987 in Japan and Europe, but device manufacturers delayed introducing the format to the United States in the face of opposition from the recording industry. The recording industry, fearing that the ability to make perfect, multi-generation copies would spur widespread copyright infringement and lost sales, had two main points of leverage over device makers. First, consumer electronics manufacturers felt they needed the recording industry's cooperation to induce consumers – many of whom were in the process of replacing their cassettes and records with compact discs – to embrace a new music format. Second, device makers feared a lawsuit for contributory copyright infringement.

Despite their strong playing hand, the recording industry failed to convince consumer electronics companies to voluntarily adopt copy restriction technology. The recording industry concurrently sought a legislative solution to the perceived threat posed by perfect multi-generation copies, introducing legislation mandating that device makers incorporate copy protection technology as early as 1987. These efforts were defeated by the consumer electronics industry along with songwriters and music publishers, who rejected any solution that did not compensate copyright owners for lost sales due to home taping.

The impasse was broken at a meeting in Athens in 1989, when representatives from the recording industry and the consumer electronics industry reached a compromise intended to enable the sale of DAT recorders in the United States. Device manufacturers agreed to include SCMS in all consumer DAT recorders in order to prevent serial copying. The recording industry would independently pursue legislation requiring royalties on digital audio recording devices and media.

A year later the songwriter Sammy Cahn and four music publishers, unhappy with the absence of a royalties provision in the Athens agreement, filed a class action copyright infringement suit against Sony. The plaintiffs sought declaratory and injunctive relief that would have prevented the manufacture, importation or distribution of DAT recorders or media in the United States. The suit brought Sony to heel. In July 1991, Sony, as part of larger agreement between the recording industry and consumer electronics makers, agreed to support legislation creating a royalty scheme for digital media. In exchange, Cahn and the publishers agreed to drop the suit.

With all the major stakeholders satisfied, the bill easily passed both houses of Congress. President George H. W. Bush signed the AHRA into law in 1992 proclaiming the act "will ensure that American consumers have access to equipment embodying the new digital audio recording technology. It also protects the legitimate rights of our songwriters, performers, and recording companies to be fairly rewarded for their tremendous talent, expertise, and capital investment. This will be accomplished by fairly compensating these artists for the copying of their works and by creating a system that will prevent unfettered copying of digital audio tapes."

== Devices covered by the AHRA ==
=== Digital Audio Recording Device defined ===
The AHRA's statutory definitions of "digital audio recording device" and "digital audio recording media" are crucial to understanding the implications of the act. The distinction between covered and non-covered devices or media dictates whether royalties must be paid and whether the SCMS copy control technologies must be included. Notwithstanding more permissive interpretations, the distinction also determines whether noncommercial copying by consumers of digital and analog musical recordings is copyright infringement—to not be considered infringement, the language of the act requires that the copies be made using covered devices and media, regardless of whether the copy control technology is present or the royalty has been paid.

The statutory definition states:

A "digital audio recording device" is any machine or device of a type commonly distributed to individuals for use by individuals, whether or not included with or as part of some other machine or device, the digital recording function of which is designed or marketed for the primary purpose of, and that is capable of, making a digital audio copied recording for private use.

The definition of "digital audio recording medium" is similar:

A "digital audio recording medium" is any material object in a form commonly distributed for use by individuals, that is primarily marketed or most commonly used by consumers for the purpose of making digital audio copied recordings by use of a digital audio recording device.

In each case, the principal distinction between what is and is not covered by the AHRA is determined by whether or not the device is marketed or designed (or in the case of media, commonly used by consumers) to make audio recordings, not the device's capabilities. A CD-R recorder included as part of a personal computer would not be a digital audio recording device under the act, since the personal computer was not marketed primarily for making copies of music. The same recorder, sold as a peripheral and marketed for the express purpose of making digital audio recordings, would fall under the act's definition of a recording device.

Today, DART royalties consist of payments made to the US Copyright Office for "blank CDs and personal audio devices, media centers, satellite radio devices, and car audio systems that have recording capabilities", as stated by AARC, who distributes a majority of AHRA funds.

=== Exceptions ===
The AHRA's definition of "digital audio recording device" includes explicit exceptions for devices that are used primarily to record non-musical sounds (such as dictation devices and answering machines) and for "professional equipment". The definition of professional equipment was to have been set by the Department of Commerce, though these regulations have never been issued. "Professional" minidisc recorders without SCMS cost thousands of dollars.

The AHRA's definition of "digital audio recording media" explicitly excludes pre-recorded but recordable media, and storage media used primarily to store information other than musical works.

This exception was crucial in RIAA v. Diamond Multimedia Systems, Inc., the only case in which the AHRA's provisions have been examined by the federal courts. The RIAA filed suit to enjoin the manufacture and distribution of the Rio PMP300, one of the first portable MP3 players, because it did not include the SCMS copy protection required by the act, and Diamond did not intend to pay royalties. The 9th Circuit, affirming the earlier District Court ruling in favor of Diamond Multimedia, ruled that the "digital music recording" for the purposes of the act was not intended to include songs fixed on computer hard drives. The court also held that the Rio was not a digital audio recording device for the purposes of the AHRA, because 1) the Rio reproduced files from computer hard drives, which were specifically exempted from the SCMS and Royalty payments under the act, 2) could not directly record from the radio or other transmissions.

== Serial Copy Management System ==
The AHRA required that all digital audio recording devices conform to a form of copy protection called the Serial Copy Management System or its functional equivalent. A SCMS is a section of code which permits limited copying of an original recording, but prohibits copies from being made by subsequent generations. The AHRA also prohibited circumvention of SCMS and importation, distribution or manufacture of such tools. Violations of either provision are punishable by up to $25 per recording, or $2,500 per device.

== AHRA royalties ==
=== Payment of royalties ===
Under the AHRA, importers and manufacturers pay royalties on "digital audio recording devices" and "digital audio recording media". Those who wish to import, manufacture and distribute must seek a statutory license from the Copyright Office. Royalties are based on "transfer price", either the sale price or the price recorded for customs purposes in the case of importers.

For digital audio recording devices, manufacturers and importers pay a 2% royalty on the device's transfer price, with a minimum royalty of $1 and a maximum of $8 ($12 for dual recorders) per device. For digital audio recording media, manufacturers and importers pay a 3% royalty.

=== Distribution of royalties ===
Under the AHRA, royalties collected by the Copyright Office on digital recording devices and digital recording media are divided into two separate funds, the Musical Works Fund and the Sound Recordings Fund. One third of the royalties goes to the Musical Works Fund, which splits its cut 50/50 between writers (distributed by ASCAP, BMI, and SESAC) and music publishers (distributed by Harry Fox Agency). These parties receive royalties according to the extent to which their recordings were distributed or broadcast.

The remaining two thirds of the royalties are placed in the Sound Recordings Fund. Four percent of these funds are taken off the top for non-featured musicians and vocalists (distributed by the AFM/SAG-AFTRA Intellectual Property Rights Distribution Fund, jointly operated by American Federation of Musicians and SAG-AFTRA). The remaining 96% is split 60/40 between two sets of "interested copyright parties". Interested copyright parties, a heretofore unknown category in copyright law, is defined by the act as featured artists receive 40%, and the owners of the right to reproduce sound recordings (an individual or company, mostly the record label, who owns the master sound recording) receive 60%. These parties receive royalties through the Alliance of Artists and Recording Companies (AARC) according to the extent to which their recordings were sold, based on sales in the United States, both digitally and retail.

Distribution of AHRA Royalties
Sound Recordings Fund		Musical Works Fund	
Record Labels (sound recording copyright holders)	38.4%	Music Publishers	16.65%
Featured Artists	25.6%	Songwriters	16.65%
Non-featured Instrumentalists and Vocalists	2.7%		
Percentage of Total Fund	66.7%	Percentage of Total Fund	33.3%

The inclusion of the reproduction rights holders was unprecedented in United States copyright law. Almost thirty-nine percent of the royalties collected under the AHRA go not to songwriters and musicians, but to the record labels who own the right to copy and distribute their recordings. The justification for this cross subsidy is that the copying enabled by the digital technology is a loss of profits for the recording industry, and that they should be compensated for this loss.

It is unclear whether the recording industry ever thought that revenue from royalties would compensate for revenues lost to the first generation copying authorized by the AHRA. Given their willingness to block all distribution of all digital audio recording media and devices in the United States, that the combination of SCMS and the price premium imposed by royalties was intended to cripple the market. It is also possible that given a new technology, and the act's unprecedented provisions (royalties, legislative mandates for copy protection), they could not predict the impact of the AHRA on adoption of the new technology.

Regardless of their intent, AHRA royalties have never been a significant revenue stream for anyone, least of all the recording industry. Revenues for the Copyright Office's Digital Audio Recording Technologies (DART) Fund peaked at $5.2 million in 2000, and have been declining, at times precipitously, ever since. Revenues for 2005 were approximately $2.4 million. According to the US Copyright Office Licensing Division, DART funds distributed since 1993 exceed $45 million.

== Exemption from infringement actions ==
The AHRA contains one positive provision for the consumer electronics industry and consumers, section 1008, a "Prohibition on certain infringement actions:"

No action may be brought under this title alleging infringement of copyright based on the manufacture, importation, or distribution of a digital audio recording device, a digital audio recording medium, an analog recording device, or an analog recording medium, or based on the noncommercial use by a consumer of such a device or medium for making digital musical recordings or analog musical recordings.

According to the Senate, this provision was intended to "conclusively ... resolve" the debate over audio home taping, and "[create] an atmosphere of certainty to pave the way for the development and availability of new digital recording technologies and new musical recordings." In the latter regard, the law was a failure as it may have prevented the growth of a consumer market for any AHRA-covered devices.

In regard to home taping, the provision broadly permits noncommercial, private recording to analog devices and media. However, it fails to resolve the home taping debate "conclusively," as it only permits noncommercial, private recording to digital devices and media when certain technology is used.

By using the terms "digital audio recording device" and "digital audio recording medium", which have specific meanings in this legislation, Congress required that in order to be exempt from copyright infringement actions, digital copies must be made to a device or medium marketed specifically for recording audio. Though there are no reliable figures on the subject, the meager returns to the Copyright Office's DART fund amidst widespread copying and dissemination of digital music suggests that a great deal of copying, noncommercial or otherwise, is accomplished using devices not covered by the AHRA, such as portable MP3 players, computer hard drives, and most CD burners and CD-Rs.

=== Further interpretations ===
Two reports by the House of Representatives characterize the provision as legalizing digital home copying to the same degree as analog. One states "in the case of home taping, the exemption protects all noncommercial copying by consumers of digital and analog recordings," and the other states "In short, the reported legislation [Section 1008] would clearly establish that consumers cannot be sued for making analog or digital audio copies for private noncommercial use."

Similarly, language in the RIAA v. Diamond Multimedia decision suggests a broader reading of the Section 1008 exemptions, providing blanket protection for "all noncommercial copying by consumers of digital and analog musical recordings" and equating the spaceshifting of audio with the fair use protections afforded home video recordings in Sony v. Universal Studios:

In fact, the Rio's operation is entirely consistent with the act's main purpose – the facilitation of personal use. As the Senate Report explains, "[t]he purpose of [the act] is to ensure the right of consumers to make analog or digital audio recordings of copyrighted music for their private, noncommercial use." S. Rep. 102-294, at *86 (emphasis added). The act does so through its home taping exemption, see 17 U.S.C. S 1008, which "protects all noncommercial copying by consumers of digital and analog musical recordings, " H.R. Rep. 102-873(I), at *59. The Rio merely makes copies in order to render portable, or "space-shift", those files that already reside on a user's hard drive. Cf. Sony Corp. of America v. Universal City Studios, 464 U.S. 417, 455 (1984) (holding that "time-shifting" of copyrighted television shows with VCR's constitutes fair use under the Copyright Act, and thus is not an infringement). Such copying is paradigmatic non-commercial personal use entirely consistent with the purposes of the act.

This language, however, may be obiter dicta.

=== Relevance to XM lawsuit ===
The AHRA is important in the recording industry's suit against XM radio for Samsung's Helix and Pioneer's Inno XM receivers, which allow users to record blocks of satellite radio and disaggregate individual songs. XM argued that the devices are "digital audio recording devices" ("DARD") under the AHRA, and thus enjoy an exemption from copyright infringement actions for private, non-commercial copying. A New York District Court judge agreed that these devices are DARDs because they can record from a transmission without the use of an external computer or computer hard drive. As manufacturers or distributors of DARDs, Samsung and Pioneer are immune from suit so long as they satisfy the requirements under the AHRA, including payment of royalties to the US Copyright Office, on a quarterly basis, for each device distributed. However, according to the District Court, this immunity does not protect XM with regard to the recording industry suit. The recording industry's complaint was based on XM's use of their music, not on the distribution of the devices. XM is currently licensed, under Section 114 of the US Copyright Act, to provide the recording industry's music via a digital satellite broadcast service. The recording industry's complaint, however, alleges that services such as the XM + MP3 distribute permanent digital copies of sound recordings without a license. XM is being sued for distributing the music industry's music without a distribution license, not for distributing devices such as the Helix and Inno. Therefore, the District Court denied XM's motion to dismiss on grounds that the AHRA immunity with regard to distribution of DARDs does not protect XM for a copyright infringement suit based on distribution of music without a license.

== See also ==
- Sony Corp. of America v. Universal City Studios, Inc.
- Private copying levy
