= SigmaTel STMP3700 =

The SigmaTel STMP3700 is a low power System on Chip (SoC) made for PMP's (Portable Media Players). The STMP3700 is using a single ARM processor core clocked up to a maximum of 300 MHz. It was developed in 2007 for use in portable media players. It supports playing video in QVGA and decoding of various media formats. It is used in the Creative ZEN as of 2007, and the Creative ZEN X-Fi as of 2008. The STMP378x supports VGA resolutions of 640×480, higher clock frequencies and video hardware assist. Sony Walkman models using this product line include Salsa, Newton, and Freed which appeared at CES 2009. See Freescale's STMP3700 series site for more info.

== See also ==
- SigmaTel
- SigmaTel STMP3780
