= Rio Receiver =

Networked MP3 player

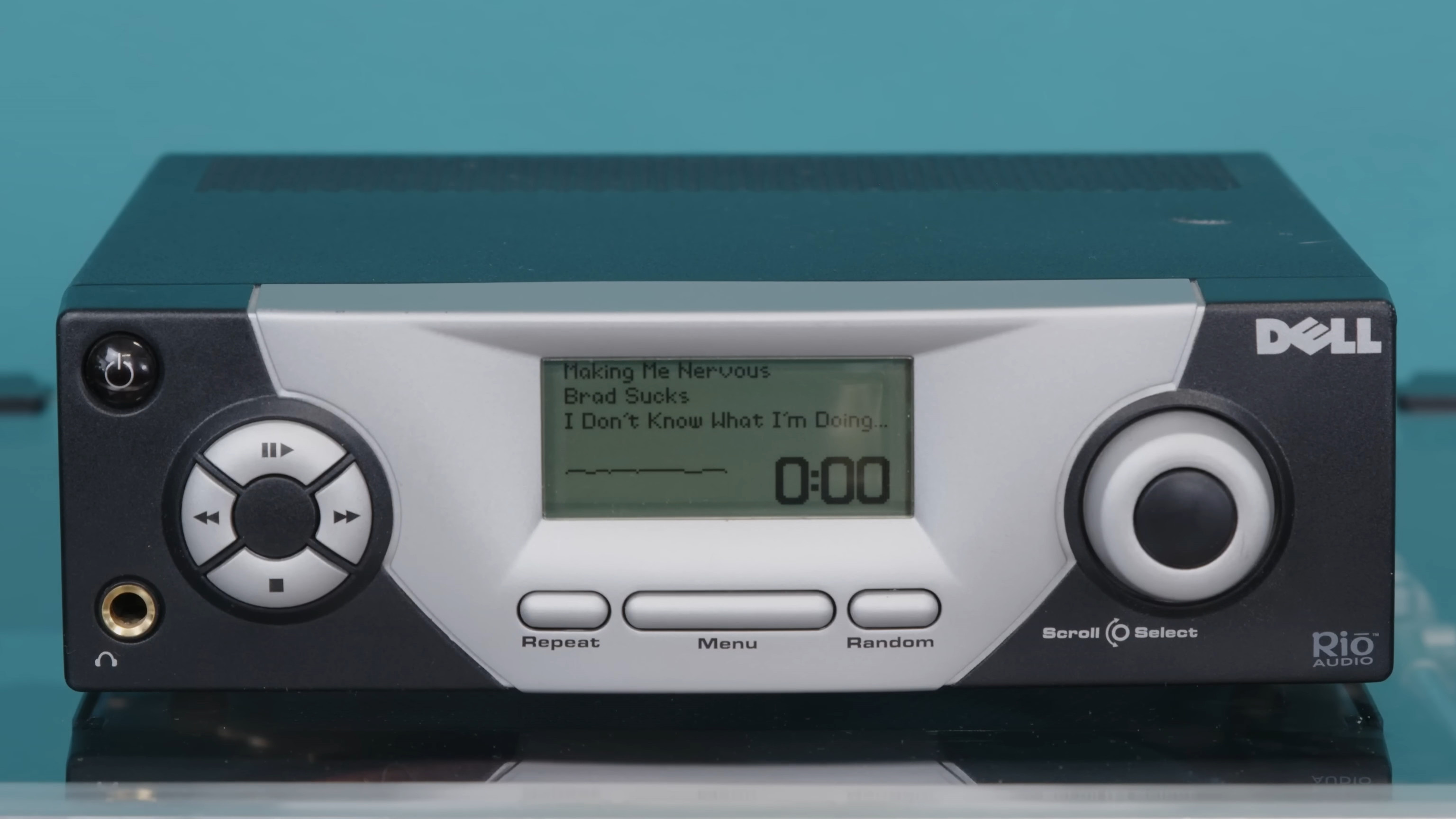
- A Rio Receiver as rebranded as the Dell Digital Audio Receiver
- Also known as: Dell Digital Audio Receiver
- Developer: Empeg Ltd
- Manufacturer: SONICblue Incorporated
- Type: Home stereo
- Released: 2000; 26 years ago
- CPU: Cirrus Logic 7212 (ARM720T-based) at 74 MHz
- Memory: 4 MB EDO RAM
- Display: 128×64 pixel LCD
- Sound: Stereophonic

The Rio Receiver was a home stereo developed by SONICblue Incorporated for playing MP3 files stored on a computer's hard drive over an Ethernet or HomePNA network. It was later rebranded and sold by Dell as the Dell Digital Audio Receiver.

With a design derived from the existing Linux-based Empeg Car, it became popular among the Linux hacking community.

The hardware consisted of a Cirrus Logic 7212 CPU (ARM720T-based) at 74 MHz, 1Mx32 (4 MB) of EDO RAM, and either 512k×16 or 256k×16 (1 MB or 0.5 MB) of NOR flash used to boot. Audio output used a Burr-Brown PCM1716 DAC that drove line outputs, the headphone jack, and a Tripath class-D digital audio amplifier for speakers. Network connections were via either a Cirrus Logic 8900A (10MBit Ethernet) or a Broadcom HomePNA 10 Mbit/s chipset; if no Ethernet link was seen at boot time, the unit tried HomePNA. The user interface was a 128×64 pixel monochrome LCD with an EL backlight, a rotary control with a push button, several buttons and IR remote control.

The unit booted via a 2.2 Linux kernel in flash which used DHCP and SSDP to discover an NFS server from which it loaded a new kernel. The second kernel then mounted a root filesystem over NFS containing a small set of standard POSIX tools and an application for selecting and playing music over the network, which was served using HTTP by the Audio Receiver Manager software running on a Windows PC. Although the music player and the Audio Receiver Manager and Broadcom HomePNA kernel driver module were proprietary software, the kernel and other tools were open source. The two-step kernel boot process allowed rapid development of changes to the kernel allowing units to run new kernels by simply power cycling them; the use of standard protocols meant a variety of replacement software components could be developed independently.
