= Recording Industry Ass'n of America v. Diamond Multimedia Systems, Inc. =

1999 United States legal case

- Court: United States Court of Appeals for the Ninth Circuit
- Full case name: Recording Industry Association of America, et al v. Diamond Multimedia Systems, Inc.
- Argued: April 15, 1999
- Decided: June 15, 1999
- Citations: 180 F.3d 1072 (9th Cir. 1999); 51 U.S.P.Q.2d (BNA) 1115

Case history
- Prior history: 29 F. Supp. 2d 624 (C.D. Cal. 1998)

Court membership
- Judges sitting: Diarmuid O'Scannlain, A. Wallace Tashima, Edward C. Reed, Jr. (D. Nev.)

Case opinions
- Majority: O'Scannlain, joined by Tashima, Reed

Laws applied
- Audio Home Recording Act

Recording Indus. Ass’n of Am. v. Diamond Multimedia Sys., Inc., 180 F.3d 1072, 51 U.S.P.Q.2d (BNA) 1115 (9th Cir. 1999) was a case decided by the United States Court of Appeals for the Ninth Circuit in 1999. The court applied the Audio Home Recording Act to the Rio digital audio player manufactured by Diamond Multimedia, concluding that the Rio was not a "digital audio recording device" under that statute.

== Issues ==
The RIAA brought suit against Diamond Multimedia Systems, Inc, (Diamond), "alleging that the Rio [a device manufactured by Diamond] does not meet the requirements for digital audio recording devices under the Audio Home Recording Act of 1992, 17 U.S.C. § 1001 et seq. (the "Act"), because it does not employ a Serial Copyright Management System ("SCMS") that sends, receives, and acts upon information about the generation and copyright status of the files that it plays." The Rio was defined as a portable digital audio device which "allows a user to download MP3 audio files from a computer and to listen to them elsewhere."

The lower court denied the RIAA's request for injunctive relief, holding that the RIAA had failed to demonstrate a likelihood of success on the merits, and the RIAA appealed.

On appeal, the ninth circuit upheld the lower court's decision to deny injunctive relief but found that the lower court had erred in holding that the Rio was a covered device under the AHRA. The court noted that in order to be a digital audio recording device, the Rio must be able to reproduce, either "directly" or "from a transmission," a "digital music recording."

== Space shifting ==
Language in the court's decision suggests that noncommercial copying of recordings from a PC's hard disk to the Rio is a fair use under Sony v. Universal. The ruling reads:

In fact, the Rio's operation is entirely consistent with the Act's main purpose – the facilitation of personal use. As the Senate Report explains, "[t]he purpose of [the Act] is to ensure the right of consumers to make analog or digital audio recordings of copyrighted music for their private, noncommercial use." S. Rep. 102-294, at *86 (emphasis added). The Act does so through its home taping exemption, see 17 U.S.C. S 1008, which "protects all noncommercial copying by consumers of digital and analog musical recordings, " H.R. Rep. 102-873(I), at *59. The Rio merely makes copies in order to render portable, or "space-shift", those files that already reside on a user's hard drive. Cf. Sony Corp. of America v. Universal City Studios, 464 U.S. 417, 455 (1984) (holding that "time-shifting" of copyrighted television shows with VCR's constitutes fair use under the Copyright Act, and thus is not an infringement). Such copying is paradigmatic non-commercial personal use entirely consistent with the purposes of the Act.

This language, however, may be obiter dicta; the case was not about consumers' rights, but rather about whether Diamond Multimedia Systems was liable for not paying AHRA-mandated royalties after making and marketing a type of device that the plaintiffs asserted was covered by the AHRA.

Further, despite the intent expressed in Congressional reports, the actual text of the AHRA only permits private, noncommercial copying to analog media (e.g., open-reel tape and cassette tapes). Under the AHRA, such copying to digital media is only allowed when the media or the copying device is marketed specifically for audio recording, which, in turn, triggers royalty requirements under the AHRA. DAT and specially-labeled "audio" CD-Rs fall under this, but general-purpose hard drives and portable media players do not.
