= Rio Audio =

Brand name of a line of digital audio players

- Developer: Diamond Multimedia (1998–1999); SONICblue (1999–2003); D&M Holdings (2003–2005)
- Type: Digital audio players (DAP)
- Lifespan: 1998–2005
- Website: Rio Audio (archived January 4, 2005); Rio Japan (archived July 13, 2004)

Rio was a line of digital audio players and related audio products. Its first release, the Rio PMP300 digital music player (also known colloquially as simply the "Diamond Rio"), released by Diamond Multimedia in 1998, was one of the earliest notable and commercially successful devices in its category. It also became known as the target of an early lawsuit regarding the legality of such devices. Following the PMP300, various music players were released under the Rio brand name by a number of companies until the brand was retired in 2005.

== History ==
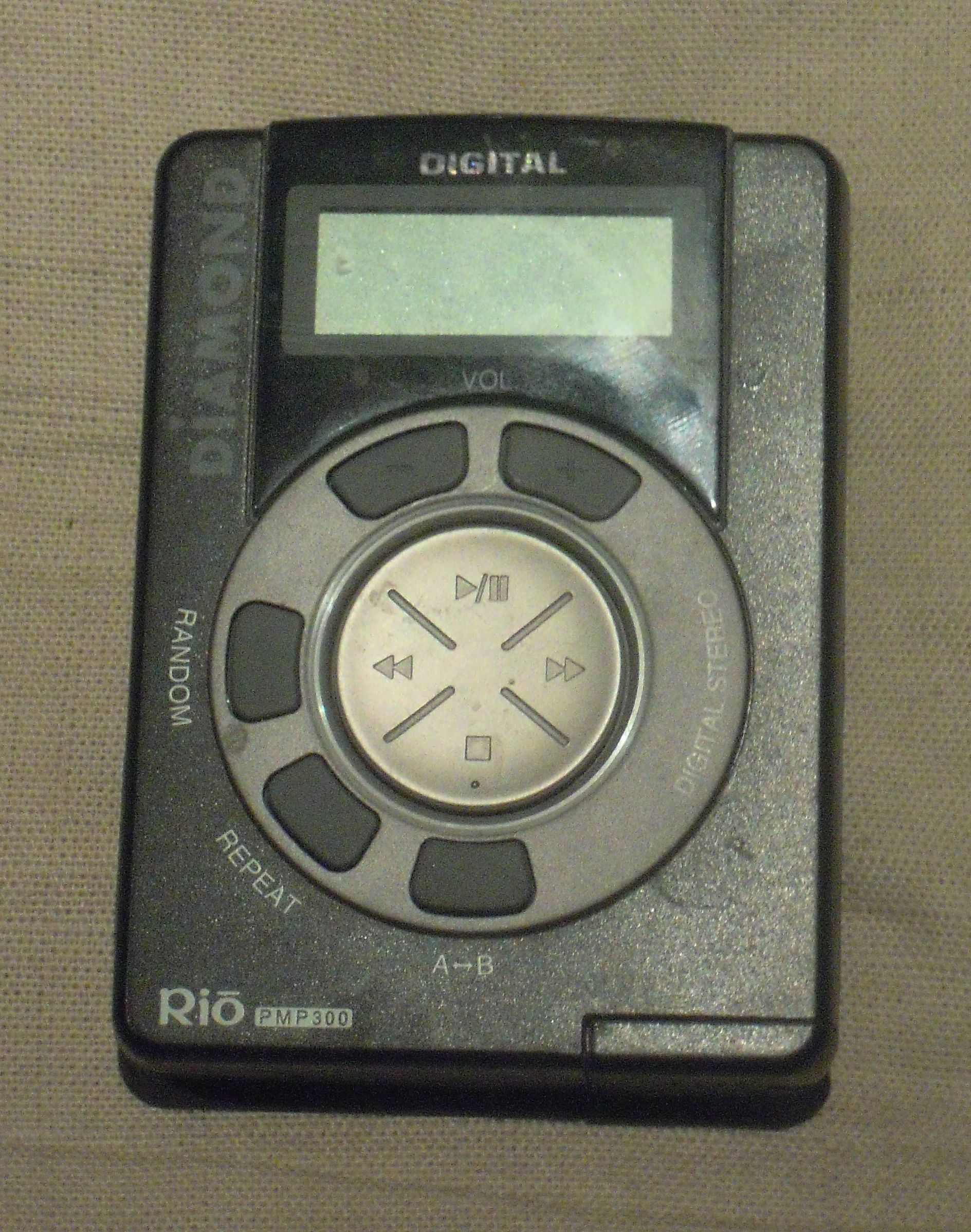
The Rio PMP300

Rio was originally a brand of California based Diamond Multimedia. Rio Audio was best known for producing the Rio PMP300 model that was the impetus for a lawsuit in 1998 by the Recording Industry Association of America. That lawsuit eventually failed, leading the way for the portable digital music industry to take off.

Diamond Multimedia merged with S3 Graphics in 1999 - the resulting company was renamed SONICblue. Rio, Inc., a subsidiary of SONICblue, was formed in 2000. The company referred to itself as Rio Digital Audio— in later years this changed to simply Rio Audio. During this time, Rio's president was Jim Cady.

On March 21, 2003, SONICblue filed for Chapter 11 bankruptcy protection and then sold off its main product lines; Rio Audio was sold to Japanese firm D&M Holdings, which owned audio brands such as Denon, forming part of their Digital Networks North America subsidiary. Rio Audio was based in Santa Clara, California. Its president from that time until March 2004 was Jeffrey Hastings.

Like some other competitors in the digital audio player business, the Rio brand was unable to compete effectively against Apple's dominant iPod series of audio players. In August 2005, D&M Holdings announced the discontinuation of its production of audio players, after it had licensed its digital audio software technology to chipmaker SigmaTel the month before. The Rio brand and trademarks were retained by D&M Holdings.

== Products ==
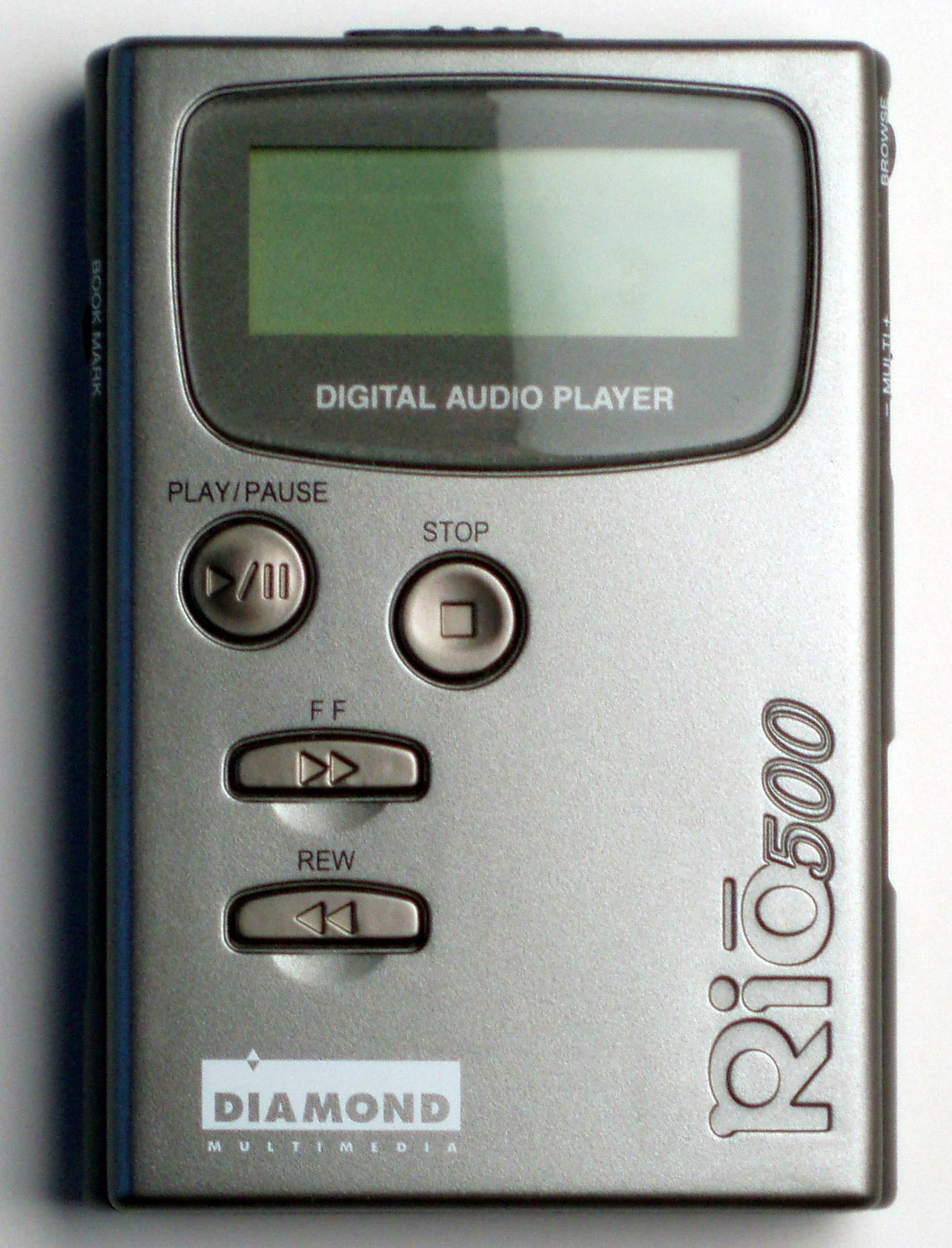
Rio 500, Rio's second player (1999)

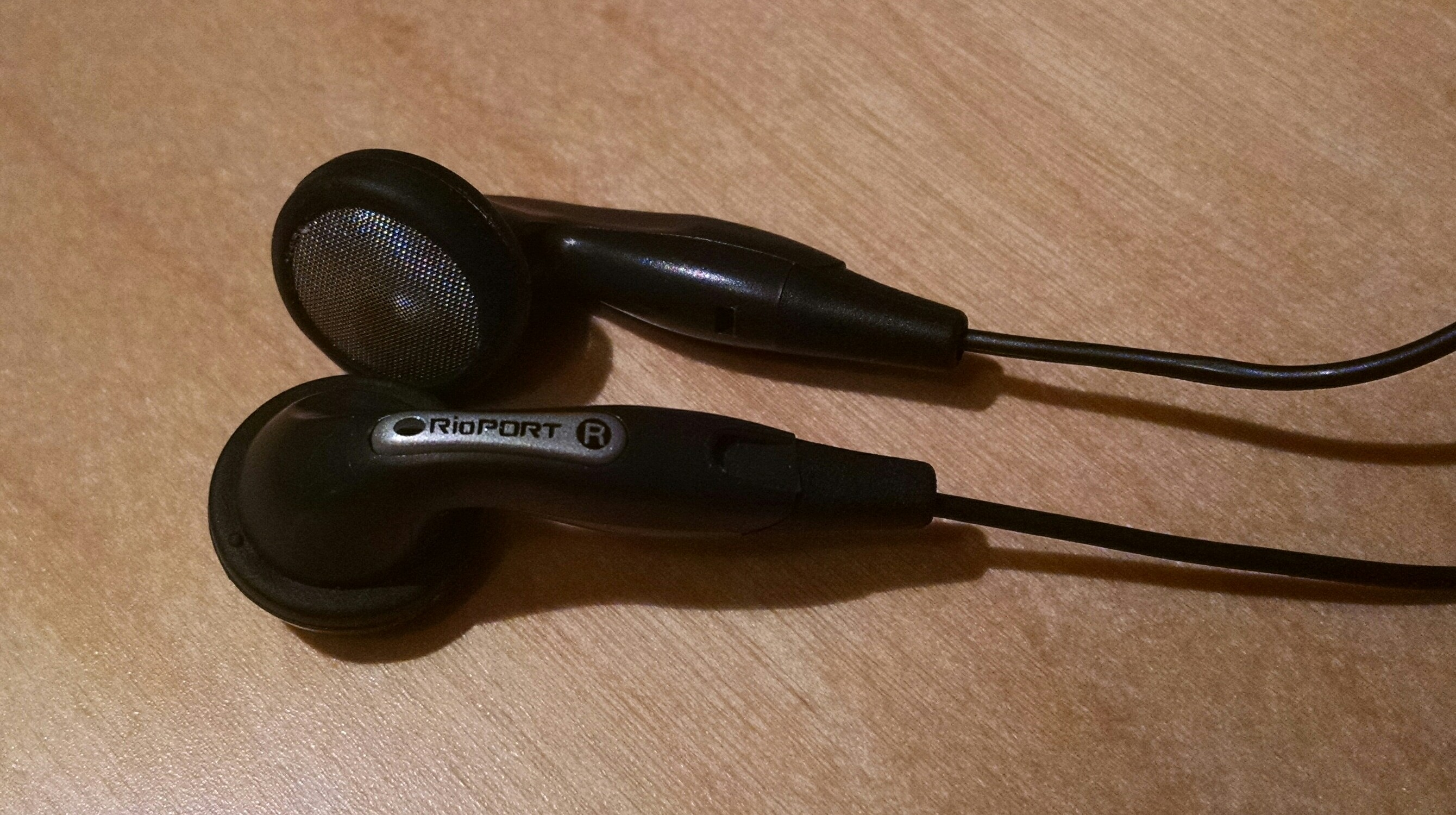
"Rioport" earbuds from the Rio 500 music player

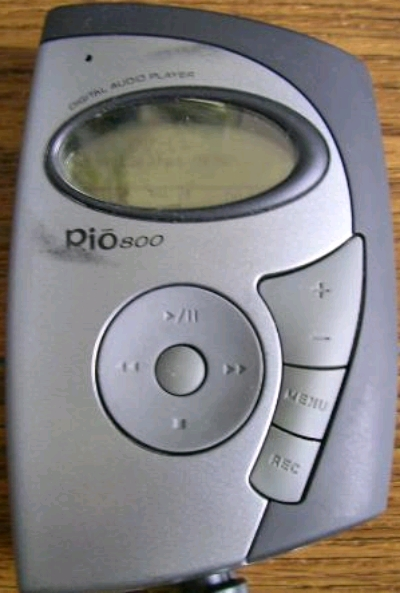
Rio 800 (2000)

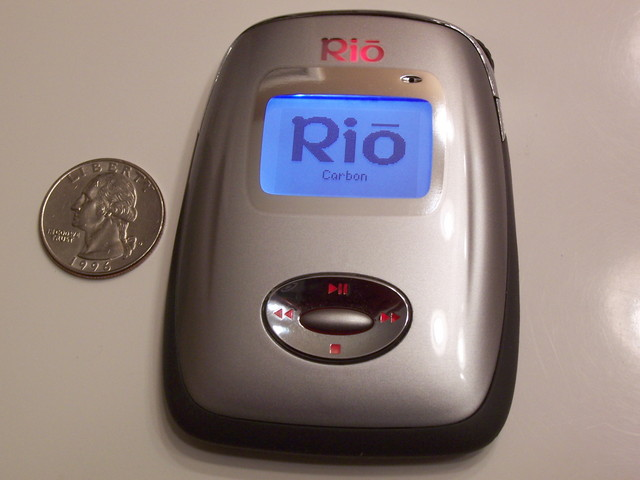
The Rio Carbon 5 GB HDD player (2004)

=== Rio USA ===
Portable digital audio players

Release Year	Player	Memory type	Memory space	Display backlight	WMA	FM radio	Voice recording	Battery type	Notes
1998	Rio PMP300	Flash	32 MB + SmartMedia	No	No	No	No	AA	
1999	Rio 500	Flash	64 MB + SmartMedia	Yes	No	No	No	AA	
2000	Rio 600	Flash	32 MB/64 MB + "Backpack"	Yes	Yes	No	No	AA	
2000	Rio 800 (incl. 800 Extreme)	Flash	128/256 MB + "Backpack"	Yes	Yes	No	Yes	Li-ion	
2001	Rio One	Flash	32 MB + SmartMedia	No	Yes	No	No	AA	Silver PMP300 design with updated internals
2002	Rio 900	Flash	192 MB + "Backpack"	Yes	Yes	No	No	Li-ion	Stripped down Rio 800
2002	Rio S10	Flash	64 MB + MMC	Yes	Yes	No	No	AA	
2002	Rio S50	Flash	128 MB + MMC	Yes	Yes	Yes	No	AA	
2002	Rio S30S	Flash	64 MB + MMC	Yes	Yes	Yes	No	AAA	Sports-oriented
2002	Rio S35S	Flash	128 MB + MMC	Yes	Yes	Yes	No	AAA	Sports-oriented
2002	Rio Riot	Hard disk	20 GB	Yes	Yes	Yes	No	Li-ion	
2003	Rio Fuse	Flash	128 MB	Yes	Yes	No	No	AAA	Keychain style
2003	Rio Cali (Sport)	Flash	128/256 MB + MMC/SD	Yes	Yes	Yes	No	AAA	Successors to the S series
2003	Rio Chiba	Flash	128/256 MB + MMC/SD	Yes	Yes	Yes	No	AAA	Successors to the S series
2003	Rio Nitrus (incl. Nitrus-S)	Hard disk	1.5 GB	Yes	Yes	No	No	Li-ion	
2003	Rio Karma	Hard disk	20 GB	Yes	Yes	No	No	Li-ion	Also supports Ogg Vorbis and FLAC playback
2004	Rio Carbon (inc. Carbon Pearl)	Hard disk	4 GB	Yes	Yes	No	Yes	Li-ion	Upgraded Nitrus with faster drive
2004	Rio ce2100/ce2110	Hard disk	2.5 GB	Yes	Yes	No	No	Li-ion	Similar to Carbon, but no microphone
2004	Rio Forge	Flash	128/256/512 MB + MMC/SD	Yes	Yes	Yes	No	AAA	Successor to the Cali/Chiba. Also has FM radio recording.

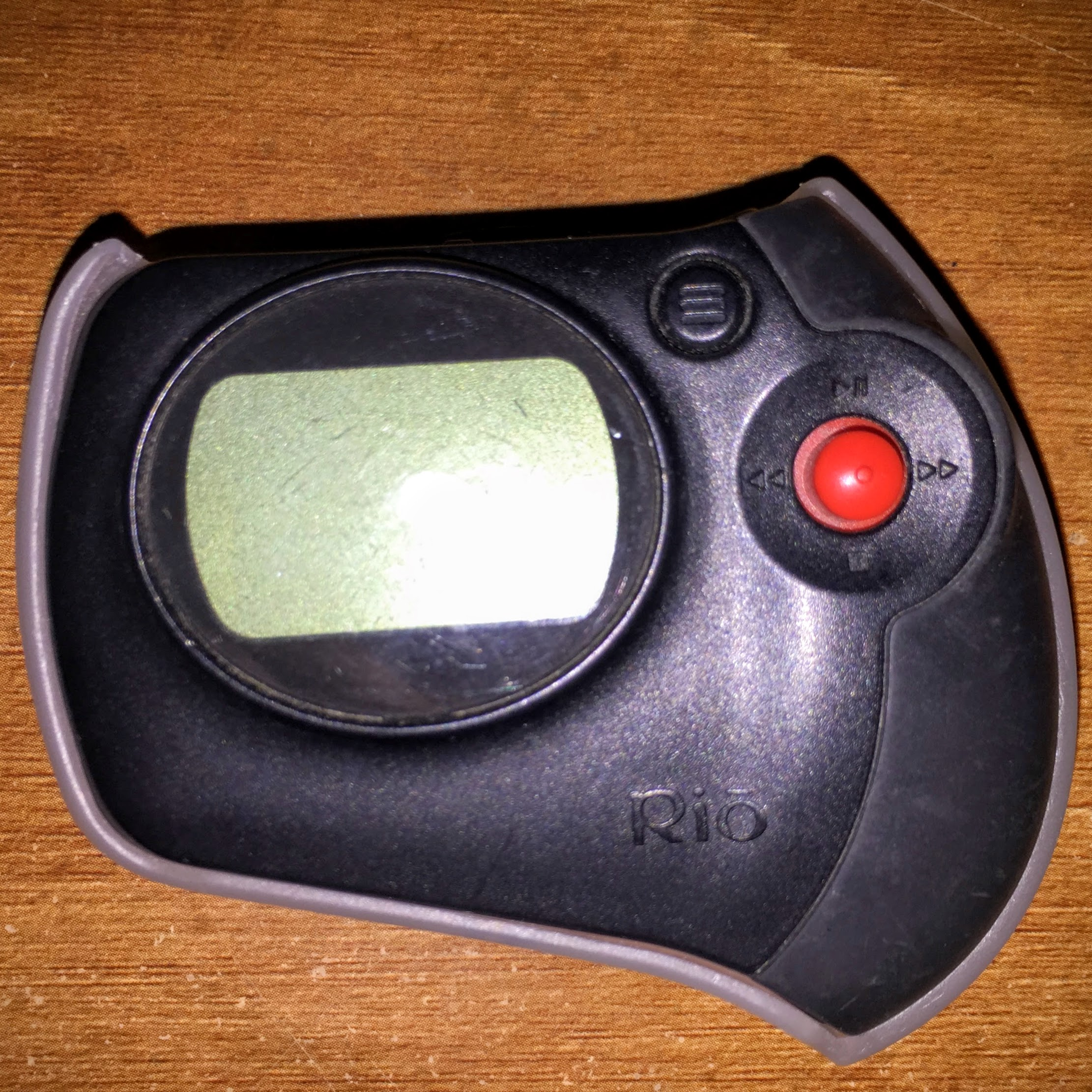
The Rio Chiba (2003)

Portable CD players

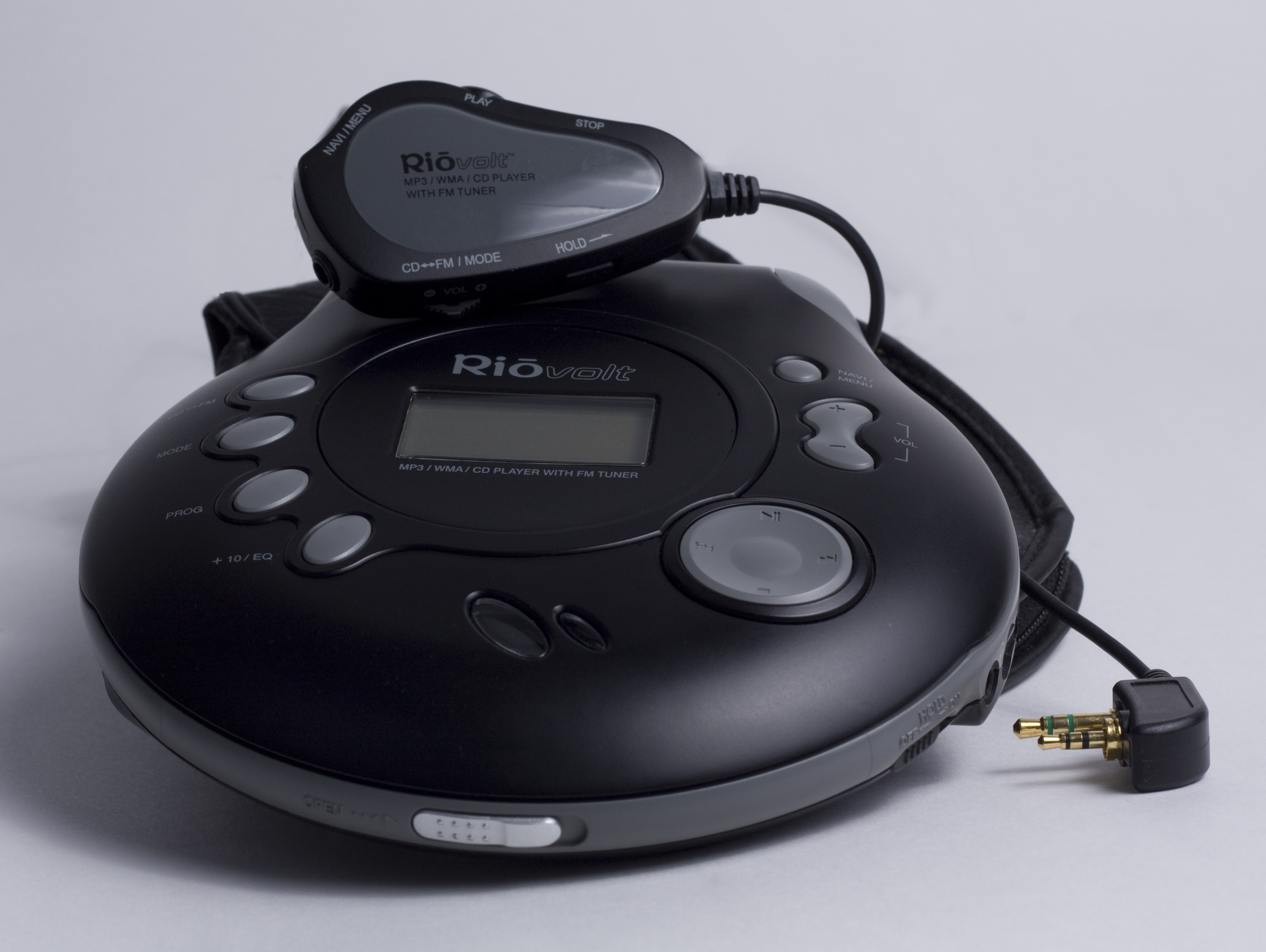
RioVolt SP250

- RioVolt SP50
- RioVolt SP60
- RioVolt SP65
- RioVolt SP90
- RioVolt SP100
- RioVolt SP150
- RioVolt SP250
- RioVolt SP350

Home audio players

- Rio HT-2030
- Rio Central (aka HSX-109)
- Rio EX-1000
- Rio Receiver

Car audio players

- Rio Car (aka Empeg Car)

=== Rio Japan ===
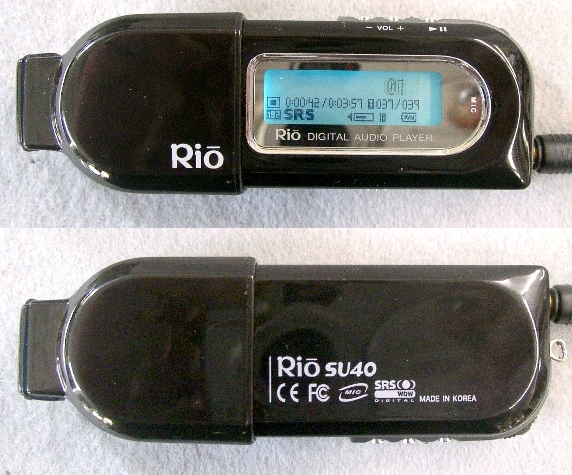
Rio su40 for the Japanese market

- Rio DR30 (OEM BeatSounds EVR150)
- Rio SU10 (OEM A-MAX Technology PA30A)
- Rio SU30 (OEM i-BEAD i-BEAD100)
- Rio SU35 (OEM AVC Technology Si-100)
- Rio SU40 (OEM i-BEAD i-BEAD200)
- Rio SU70 (OEM M-CODY MX-100)
- Rio Unite 130 (OEM M-CODY MX-250)
- Rio SU15-KJ (OEM AVC Technology)
- Rio Si-200C (OEM AVC Technology)
- Rio Si-300C (OEM AVC Technology)
- Rio LIVE air
- Rio LIVE mini
- Rio LIVE gear (OEM Foster)

=== Rio OEM models ===
- Nike PSA Play 60
- Nike PSA Play 120
- ESA S11
- Motorola M25
- Motorola M500
- Dell Digital Audio Receiver
