= Rio Karma =

Digital audio player

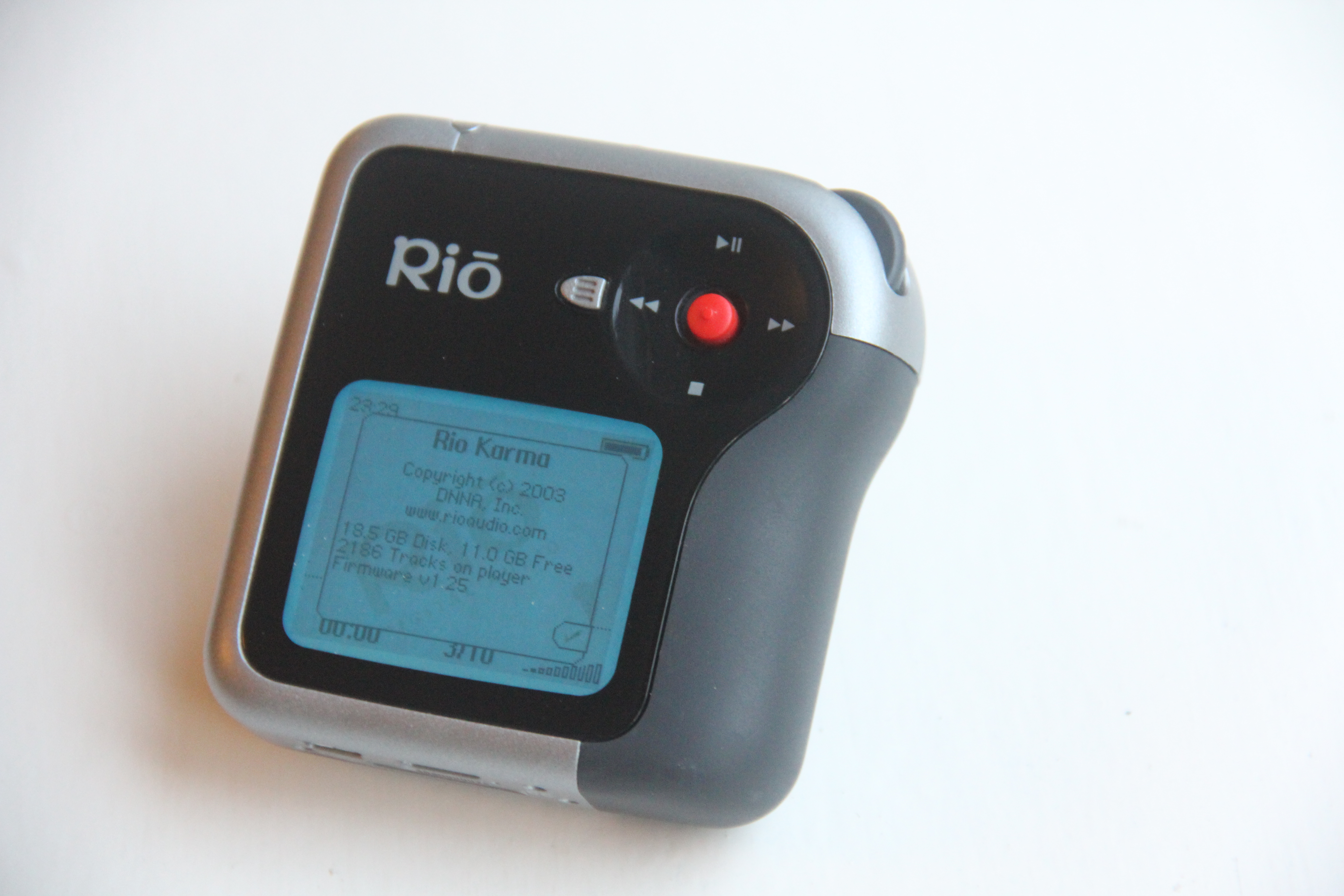
- Manufacturer: Rio
- Type: Portable media player
- Lifespan: 2003-2005
- Storage: 20 GB hard drive
- Display: backlit monochrome display
- Input: 4-way directional pad, scroll wheel, three buttons
- Connectivity: USB 2.0, Ethernet

The Rio Karma is a digital audio player originally made by the now-defunct Rio. It was released in August 2003. It measures 2.7 × 3 × 0.9 inches (6.9 × 7.6 × 2.3 cm) and weighs 5.5 ounces (160 grams). It has a 20 gigabyte (18.6 gibibyte) hard drive. The Karma is notable for its support of Ogg Vorbis and FLAC playback in addition to the usual MP3 and WMA formats, however it will not play MP2 format. It also bears the distinction of supporting file transfers via Ethernet through its docking station, as well as the standard USB 2.0. It is not supported as a plug and play removable drive, although the program Rio Taxi does allow any data to be stored. Like many Rio players, the Karma's firmware features a 5-band parametric equalizer, cross-fader, true gapless playback, animated menus, dynamic playlist generation and visualizations.

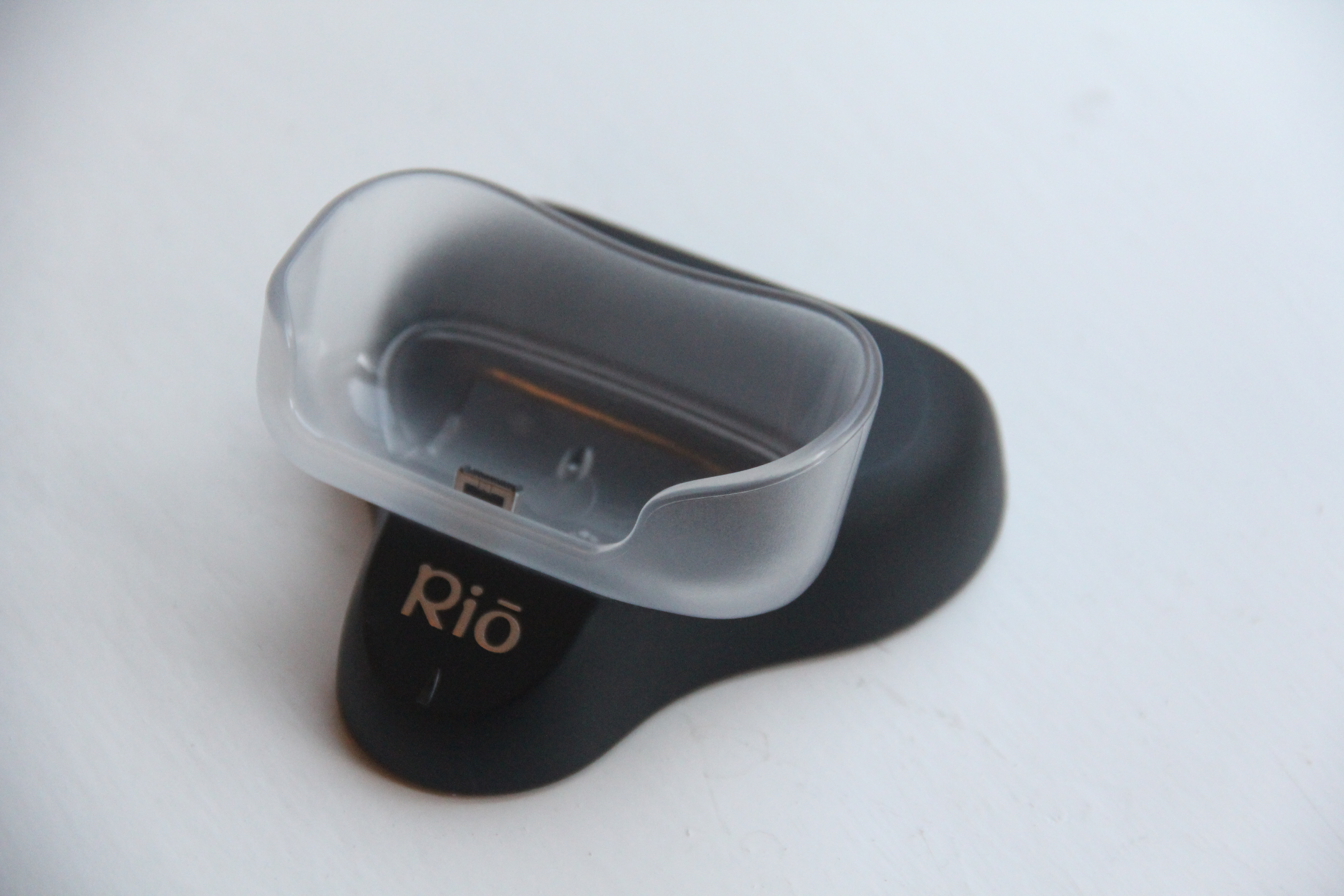
Docking station, front

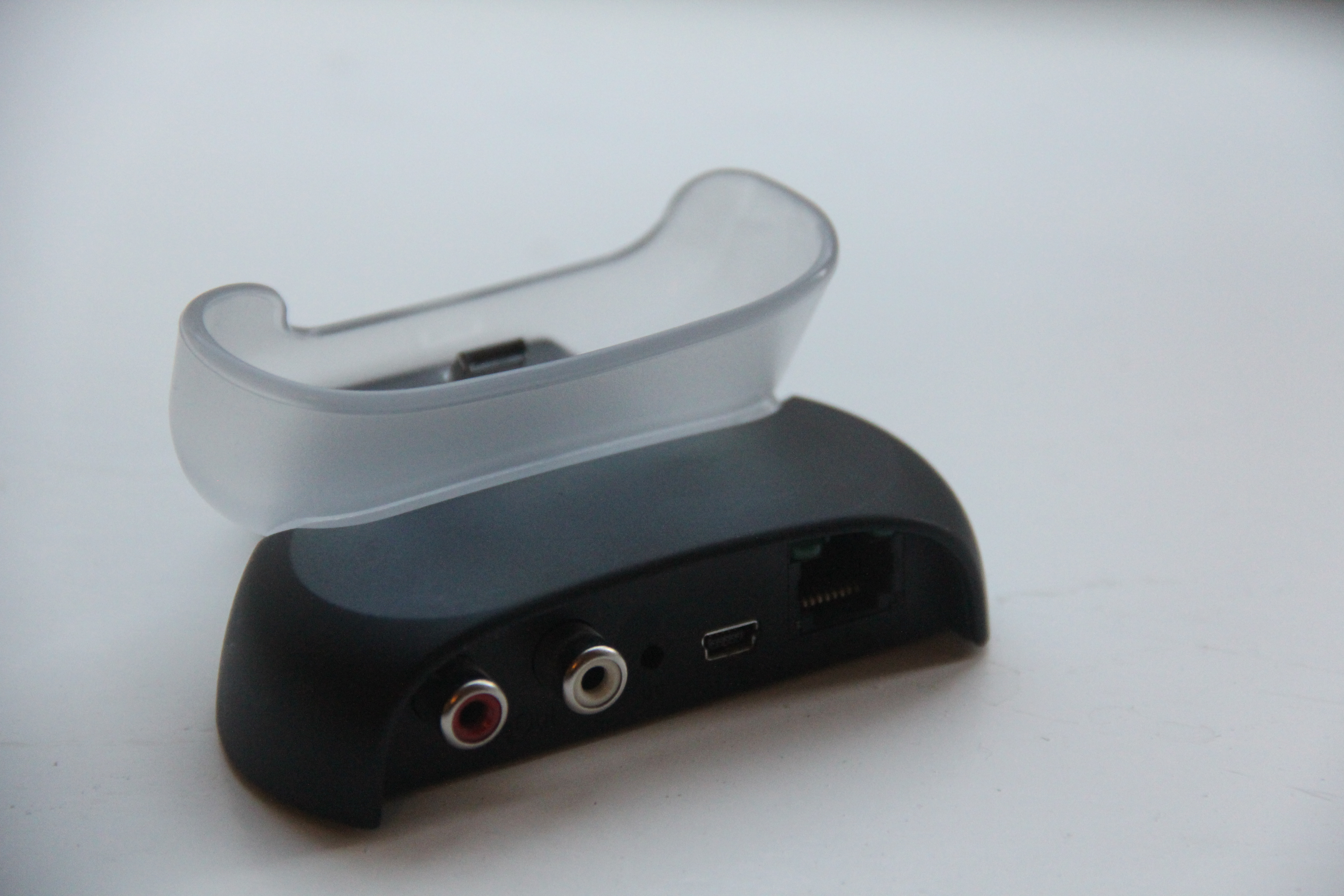
Docking station, back

== Karma Settings ==
=== Playback Screen ===
The Karma has three options for what is displayed on the play screen

- Progress Indicator
- Profile Indicator
- VU Meter for left and right channels.

=== Language ===
Options include English (US), English (UK), German, French, Japanese, Chinese & Spanish.

=== Dock Settings ===
For docking, there are four options for the "cradle glow".

- Static, with glow level setting
- Pulse with timecode
- Pulse while charging
- Pulse to music

=== Orientation ===
The player can be configured for right-handed or left-handed use. For left-handed use, the screen is inverted.

=== Modifications ===
The player uses a 20GB Hitachi Travelstar 1.8" hard drive. It is possible to install a higher data capacity hard drive, commonly 30, 40, or 60GB, though these may be physically larger, requiring case modifications. It is also possible to swap the hard drive for CompactFlash-based storage, as it shares the original IDE drive's signaling pinout.

== See also ==
- Trekstor Vibez
- Empeg Car
