= SONICblue Incorporated =

Former American audio/video equipment manufacturer

- Formerly: S3 Incorporated
- Type: Public
- Traded as: Nasdaq: SBLU
- Industry: Consumer electronics
- Founded: 1989 (as S3)
- Fate: Chapter 11 bankruptcy, March 2003; businesses sold
- Headquarters: Santa Clara, California, United States
- Key people: Ken Potashner (Chairman and CEO); Greg Ballard (CEO); Andrew Wolfe (CTO)
- Products: Rio digital audio players ReplayTV digital video recorders Dual-deck videocassette recorders and DVD/VCR combinations
- Brands: GoVideo
- Revenue: $272 million (2002)
- Net income: ▼$106 million (2002)
- Subsidiaries: Diamond Multimedia Systems; ReplayTV; Sensory Science; RioPort

SONICblue Incorporated (NASDAQ:SBLU) was a public company based in Santa Clara, California. The firm was a manufacturer of home audio/video equipment with an estimated revenue of $100M - $250M and approximately 700 employees.

SONICblue first filed for Chapter 11 Bankruptcy in March 2003.

SONICblue closed its operations in 2007 amid controversy regarding conflict of interest and criminal disclosure violations involving fraud upon the court by its law firm Pillsbury Winthrop Shaw Pittman.

== History ==
=== Origins as S3 ===
The business began in 1989 as S3, a maker of chipsets for personal computers that moved over the following decade into PC graphics chips. That market proved unstable, and by the end of the 1990s the company needed a different direction.

It found one in portable digital audio. On June 16, 1999, Diamond Multimedia prevailed in the copyright action brought against its Rio player by the Recording Industry Association of America, and a week later S3 agreed to buy the company for $173 million. Reports at the time of the agreement put the value of the all-stock transaction somewhere between $160 million and $180 million, and noted that S3 was roughly a third the size of the firm it was acquiring. Diamond drew as much as 70 per cent of its revenue from 3-D accelerator boards, was entering wireless communications, and operated the RioPort download service. Its first player, the PMP 300, had sold about 200,000 units at $119 and handled only unencrypted files; a successor announced the same month, the PMP 500, was priced at $269, held about two hours of audio, supported Windows Media Audio alongside MP3, and worked with Macintosh computers as well as Windows.

Shareholders of both companies approved the merger in September 1999 on terms giving Diamond holders 0.52 S3 shares for each of their own. S3 then split itself into four units: communications, in Vancouver, Washington; multimedia, in Santa Clara, California; professional graphics, in Starnberg, Germany; and RioPort, in San Jose, California. Chief executive Ken Potashner presented the combination as a way of pairing S3's technology with an established consumer brand and its distribution.

=== Renaming and departure from graphics ===
S3 announced on November 1, 2000, that it would trade as SONICblue with immediate effect and that its Nasdaq ticker would become SBLU a fortnight later. The graphics operation was being separated into S3-Via, a joint venture with VIA Technologies that had just cleared Taiwan's Ministry of Economic Affairs after an initial refusal four months earlier. Potashner, by then chairman as well as chief executive, described the step as a break with a decade of graphics work and a turn towards digital media and information appliances built around the Rio line, home networking and Internet access products. Within about a year of the Diamond purchase the company had also signed distribution arrangements with Dell and sold Nike-branded versions of the Rio players.

=== Acquisitions of 2001 ===
In February 2001 SONICblue took over two further consumer electronics businesses, ReplayTV and Sensory Science, in transactions settled in stock. ReplayTV built hard-disk personal video recorders and had reached only about 40,000 service subscriptions; after commercial difficulties it had pulled out of consumer electronics to license its technology instead. Sensory Science made dual-deck videocassette recorders and combined DVD and VCR units, and distributed television sets made by the German manufacturer Loewe. Chief technology officer Andrew Wolfe said the recorder technology might also serve for recording music or as a server for home entertainment networks.

Accounts of the terms differ. The contemporaneous report placed the combined value of the two deals at roughly $128 million, of which about $8 million was attributed to Sensory Science. Writing two years afterwards, Forbes gave $123 million as the sum paid for ReplayTV alone and described the transaction as a purchase of the assets of a bankrupt company.

== Litigation ==
=== ReplayTV and the studios ===
SONICblue added a function to the recorders that automatically removed advertising during playback, which brought it into conflict with the television industry. In November 2001 a group of broadcasters and studios including Disney, Paramount, NBC, CBS and ABC sued the company, arguing that its conduct struck at the economic basis of free-to-air television. Two features were at issue: the automatic removal of commercials, and Send Show, which let an owner pass a recorded programme over the Internet to a limited number of other users. Wolfe treated the action as pre-emptive, pointing to the company's intention to sell programming directly from producers and contending that personal computers presented a greater risk of copying yet attracted no comparable litigation. The ReplayTV 4000 range, with capacities from 40 to 320 gigabytes, was due to ship before the end of that month. Forbes counted 28 media companies among the plaintiffs and reported that publicity around the case lifted sales of the recorders for a short period.

The first complaint was filed on October 31, 2001, and further ones followed through November; the plaintiffs sought to have ReplayTV alter its software so that data on how customers used the devices would be reported back to them. An order to that effect was issued on April 26, 2002, and the Electronic Frontier Foundation and Electronic Privacy Information Center filed an amicus curiae brief against disclosure on May 13. The order was later reversed. Forbes dated the order to May 2002 and reported that the company overturned it on appeal. In a filing of March 2002 SONICblue recorded the studios' contention that its planned manufacture and sale of the ReplayTV 4000 amounted to copyright infringement, and stated that the outcome could not then be determined.

The proceedings were suspended when the company entered bankruptcy. They were brought to an end in January 2004, when District Judge Cooper dismissed the remaining declaratory claims: the infringement actions against ReplayTV had been dropped and the copyright owners had given a covenant not to sue, so no live controversy remained and the court lacked jurisdiction under Article III.

=== Securities and patent claims ===
The same March 2002 filing reported settlements of a securities class action and related derivative litigation, under which SONICblue was to contribute 2,401,501 of its shares and Deloitte & Touche up to $250,000, at a combined cost to the company, after insurance, of about $8.6 million. It also recorded a patent infringement complaint the company had brought against TiVo and TiVo's counter-complaint.

== Bankruptcy ==
SONICblue ended 2002 with a loss of $106 million on sales of $272 million, and its holding in the Taiwanese foundry United Microelectronics had fallen in value with the semiconductor market. Facing $180 million of debt maturing in October and a further $150 million of other liabilities, the company said in March 2003 that it would seek protection under Chapter 11 and dispose of several units. Its shares, worth about $6 two years earlier, closed at six cents on March 21, 2003. Chief executive Greg Ballard had proposed the previous October to move ReplayTV from online sales into conventional retail and cut its price sharply for the holiday season, in the hope of generating cash to sustain the litigation. Four entities filed together: SONICblue itself, Diamond Multimedia Systems, ReplayTV and Sensory Science, as cases 03-51775 to 03-51778 in the United States Bankruptcy Court for the Northern District of California.

At the time of the announcement the Rio unit was to go to D&M Holdings, owner of the Denon and Marantz audio brands, for $40 million less $5 million of assumed liabilities, on terms not yet final, and the GoVideo brand to Opta Systems, a subsidiary of Carmo Investments, for $12.5 million. ReplayTV passed to Digital Networks North America, another D&M subsidiary.

The bankruptcy produced findings against the company's law firm, Pillsbury Winthrop Shaw Pittman. In an opinion of December 29, 2009, Bankruptcy Judge Marilyn Morgan recorded that Pillsbury had received a written demand from a group of noteholders threatening indemnification claims if objections were raised to their claims, and that neither Pillsbury nor co-counsel Levene Neale disclosed it. That the noteholders' controlling position on the creditors' committee created a disabling conflict that went undisclosed; and that a waiver by VIA of its senior status, which benefited only those noteholders, was omitted from the motions seeking approval of the settlement. Pillsbury was disqualified from acting for SONICblue and a Chapter 11 trustee was appointed. In the same opinion the judge awarded a creditor, SB Claims Holder, a further $300,000 as an administrative expense under 11 U.S.C. § 503(b) for its substantial contribution in challenging the fee application of O'Melveny & Myers, a challenge that led the firm to give up roughly $750,000 in unpaid fees.

== Aftermath ==
Digital Networks North America put the ReplayTV 5500 on sale in August 2003 without either of the features that had drawn the studios' action: automatic advertisement removal and Send Show were both absent, although a manual QuickSkip control advancing playback in thirty-second steps remained. The new models could divide recording between several units on a home network, resume a paused programme on a second unit in another room, distinguish repeats from first showings and rank conflicting recordings by priority. Four versions were offered, from about $550 for 40 hours of capacity to about $1,200 for 320 hours.

D&M Holdings announced in August 2005 that it was leaving the mass-market portable player business, while keeping the Rio name for possible use on premium products alongside Denon, Marantz and Boston Acoustics. The Rio division had accounted for more than 92 per cent of the group's operating losses in the first quarter of the 2005 financial year. The report traced the brand from Diamond Multimedia through the merger with S3, the change of name to SONICblue and the 2003 bankruptcy to its purchase by D&M.
