= RioPort =

RioPort, Inc. was created in 1999 as a spin-out from the Rio (digital audio players) group of Diamond Multimedia. RioPort was formed to create an Internet service for consumers to acquire legal digital music to play on their computers and MP3 players, i.e., a precursor service to the iTunes music service from Apple Computer.

RioPort was the first internet music service (cloud service) to legally offer digital songs from all the major music labels, including the ability to play on portable MP3 players. A Warner Music executive commented; "Rioport's expertise as an application service provider (music cloud service), combined with their relationships with leading online retailers and music portals will ensure that our artist's music will be available conveniently and securely to millions of music fans."

RioPort's cloud based music service powered e-tailer websites such as MTV, Hewlett Packard, Virgin Music, Yahoo and supported MP3 Player consumer electronics devices such as from Samsung, Rio MP3 Player, Sanyo, and the first music phone from Nokia.

RioPort management included Chairman Mark Thompson (investor), streaming media pioneer James E Long, CEO, Anthony J Schaller, CTO/SVP Technology and J.D. Heilprin, VP Content.

RioPort's major investors included Oak Investment Partners, Viacom, Paul Allen's Vulcan Ventues, and consumer electronics company S3 Graphics. Other investors included Microsoft, EMC, and digital media security company Macrovision.

RioPort merged with Ecast, Inc. in October 2002.
