= Rio Riot =

MP3 digital audio player by Diamond Multimedia

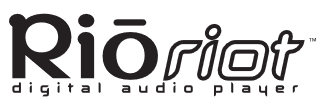
Logo

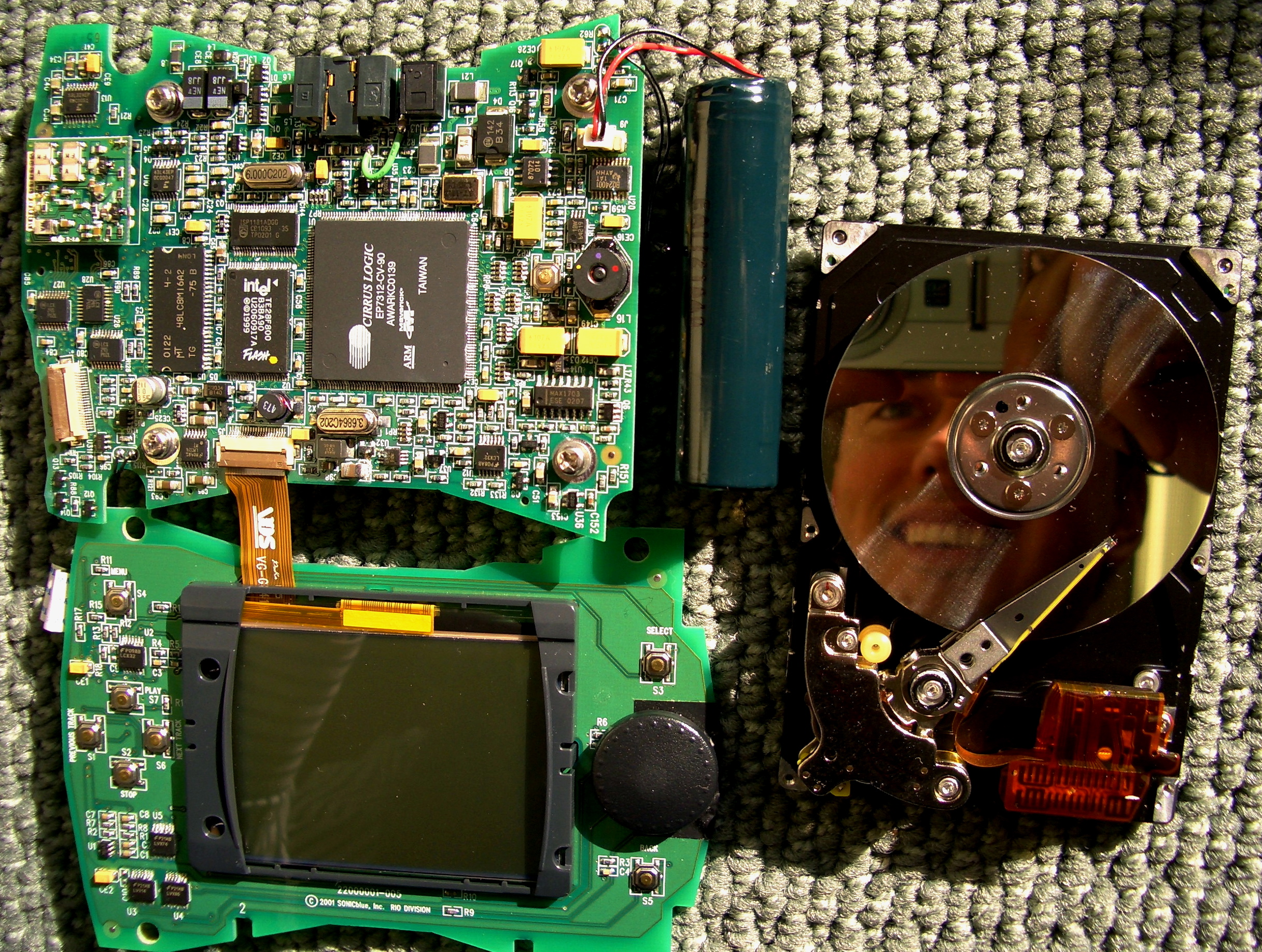
Disassembled and unfolded Rio Riot

The Rio Riot was a hard disk-based "jukebox" MP3 digital audio player produced by SonicBlue (Formerly Diamond Multimedia) as part of the Rio line. It shipped in March 2002, and was an early competitor to the Apple iPod, coming out some four months after its release.

== Reception ==
Critical reviews of the Riot were mixed, with many describing it as a good device in its own right, but one that fell short of the iPod. Reviewers praised its generally strong hardware and large storage; however, they panned its large size and slow USB transfer rates, especially relative to the iPod's FireWire connection.

== Specifications ==
- 20 GB hard disk drive
- USB 1.1
- 240×160 backlit monochrome LCD
- FM tuner
- 10 hours per charge at 50% volume battery life
- iTunes support
- Supported formats: WMA, MP3, including ID3 and WMA tagging support
- *Note*: Lacked ability to retrieve data off HD.
  - This was due to the legal department at SonicBlue being concerned that it would trigger the RIAA to call it a "mass piracy device" triggering a lawsuit. The engineers pushed hard for the Riot to be a "USB Mass storage class device" but were rebuffed every time.

== Preserved specimens ==
One Rio Riot is held by the Computer History Museum in Mountain View, California.
