= Pioneer Inno =

Second-generation XM2go radio receiver model

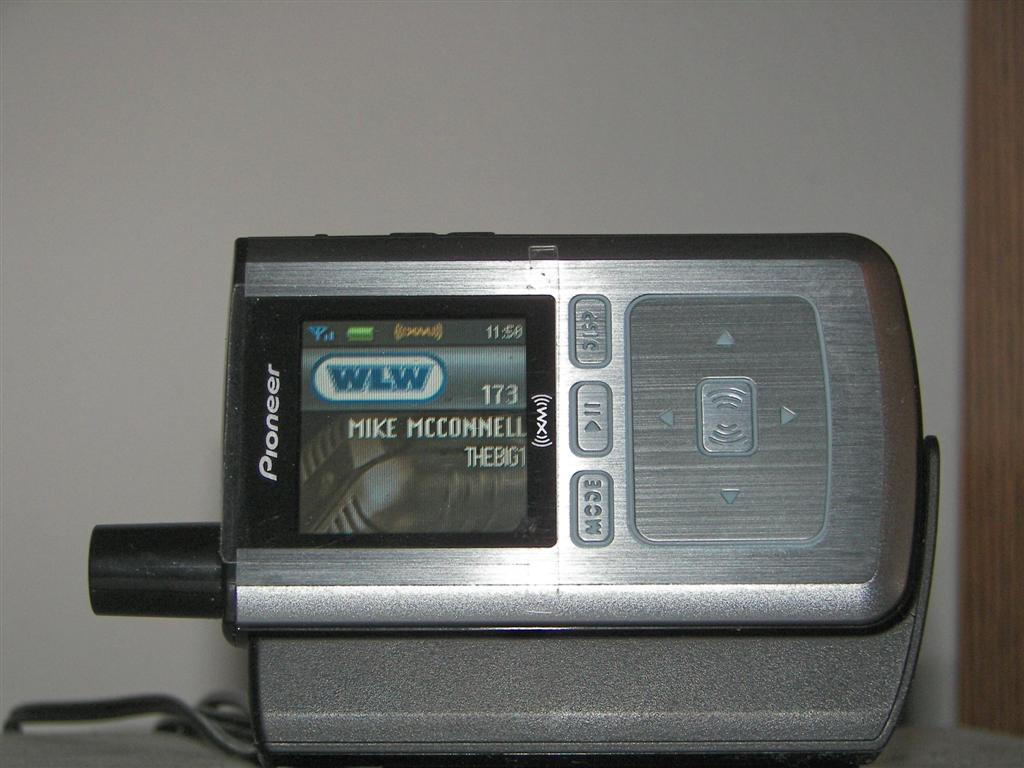
700 WLW on XM's Pioneer Inno.

The Pioneer Inno is a second-generation XM2go radio receiver model for use with the XM satellite radio service. The Inno improves upon the first generation units by having an improved built-in antenna for live portable reception, improved recording capabilities allowing unlimited sessions, and increased recording capacity. The Inno has the ability to record individual songs from the XM service and has a capacity of 1 GB for storage. This flash storage is factory configured as two separate blocks, for approximately 22 hours of XM content, and approximately 518 MB of MP3 or WMA music or audio tracks and can be configured for 100% XM content for a full estimated 50 hours. These files are stored internally in their native AACplus audio format and cannot be exported from the unit digitally.

On May 16, 2006, the RIAA (Recording Industry Association of America) sued XM, stating that the device infringes on copyrights. XM defends the device by stating that the songs recorded from the XM service cannot be exported from the particular Inno device it was saved on, and the owner of the Inno must remain an XM subscriber to continue to access material recorded from XM.

On September 6, 2006, XM Radio announced a Pink Inno available exclusively at Circuit City where $30 from each unit sold goes to benefit the Susan G. Komen Breast Cancer Foundation's fight against breast cancer.
