= SigmaTel =

1993–2008 American system-on-a-chip company

SigmaTel, Inc.
- Industry: Semiconductors
- Founded: 1993; 33 years ago
- Defunct: 2008; 18 years ago
- Fate: acquired by Freescale Semiconductor
- Headquarters: Austin, Texas, United States
- Area served: Worldwide
- Products: SoCs (STMP3xxx), Audio Codecs (STAC9xxx)

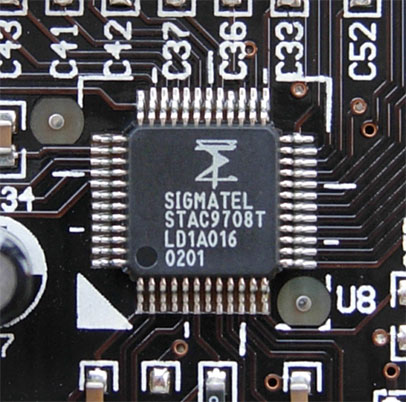
SigmaTel's AC'97 audio codec chip

SigmaTel, Inc., was an American system-on-a-chip (SoC), electronics and software company headquartered in Austin, Texas, that designed AV media player/recorder SoCs, reference circuit boards, SoC software development kits built around a custom cooperative kernel and all SoC device drivers including USB mass storage and AV decoder DSP, media player/recorder apps, and controller chips for multifunction peripherals. SigmaTel became Austin's largest IPO as of 2003 when it became publicly traded on NASDAQ. The company was driven by a talented mix of electrical and computer engineers plus other professionals with semiconductor industry experience in Silicon Hills, the number two IC design region in the United States, after Silicon Valley.

SigmaTel (trading symbol SGTL) was acquired by Freescale Semiconductor in 2008 and delisted from NASDAQ.

== History ==
Early on, a significant portion of SigmaTel’s business revolved around integrated circuits for telecommunications, modems, and voice-processing applications (such as speakerphone and voice-recording chips for computers and office equipment). In the late 1990s and in the early 2000s SigmaTel produced audio codecs which went into AC'97 on-board audio for computer motherboards and MP3 players.

In 2004, SigmaTel SoCs were found in over 70% of all flash memory-based MP3 devices sold in the global market. However, SigmaTel lost its last iPod socket in 2006 when it was not found in the next-generation iPod Shuffle. PortalPlayer was the largest competitor, but were bought by Nvidia after PortalPlayer's chips lost their socket in the iPod. SigmaTel was voted "Best Place to Work in Austin 2005" by the Austin Chronicle.

In July 2005, SigmaTel acquired the rights to different software technologies sold by Digital Networks North America (a subsidiary of D&M Holdings, and owner of Rio Audio).

On July 25, 2006, Integrated Device Technology, Inc. (IDT) announced its acquisition of SigmaTel, Inc.'s AC'97 and High Definition Audio (HD-Audio) PC and Notebook audio codec product lines for approximately $72 million in cash, and the acquisition of SigmaTel's intellectual property and employee teams necessary for continuing existing product roadmap, with expected closure by the end of July.

In mid-2007 SigmaTel introduced portable QVGA 320×240 portable video decoder, and support for higher resolutions using WMV and MPEG4 followed.

Some SigmaTel microcontrollers, like STDC982G, are used in printers manufactured by Samsung and sold under the Xerox brand. Kodak all-in-one printers also use SigmaTel IC's.

SigmaTel's equity traded as low as $100 million below book value. Its peak share price was $45 and its day one IPO max share price was around $18. After the SGTL IPO in 2003, Austin's other biggest IPO was the later spinoff of Freescale Semiconductor by Motorola Corporation. Over 150 models of MP3/WMA players used SigmaTel SDK3.1 and the STMP35xx SoC with its MS DRM10 capabilities.

On February 4, 2008, Freescale Semiconductor announced that it had entered into a definitive agreement to acquire SigmaTel for $110 million. The agreement closed in the second quarter of 2008 and all SGTL shares were purchased by Freescale for $3 each.

Freescale continued developing and selling the STMP3 portable AV SoC product line, which are ARM9-based STMP37xx and STMP36xx AV SoCs, and the DSP56k-based STMP35xx portable AV SoC. Product info was on Freescale's ARM-based controller site. Freescale's i.MX2 ARM9 and i.MX3 ARM11-based multimedia SoC product line (especially analog SoC features) have been integrated with the STMP3xxx product line, resulting in a stronger portable multimedia product portfolio.

On February 25, 2009, Freescale laid off 70% of the former SigmaTel team as part of a company-wide reduction in force. No new products under the SigmaTel design teams will be created. A 'skeleton crew' was chosen to stay and support existing OEM customers that are using the existing chips until the chips enter their 'End Of Life' phase. Freescale integrated analog IP from SigmaTel into its competing product lines and continues to pursue component and Real Time OS device driver-based support for OEMs rather than the complete hardware and software turnkey system design approach of the successful SigmaTel startup that powered hundreds of millions of portable media players enjoyed by many users.

After winning MP3 player integrated circuit patent infringement suits at the U.S. International Trade Commission when the STMP35xx principal firmware engineer documented how SigmaTel firmware uses its dynamic voltage and frequency scaling related patents, U.S. Customs physically destroyed Actions Semiconductor products at the U.S. border for intellectual property infringement. SigmaTel settled all patent litigation and in 2007 entered into a cross-licensing agreement with the Zhuhai, China-based Actions Semiconductor Co. Ltd. Both companies also agreed not to pursue possible third-party IP infringements or new legal action against each other and their respective customers for three years. Consequently, all of Actions' current and future products may be imported into the U.S. market without restrictions.

== Products ==
SigmaTel offered a line of audio and video codec chips that were integrated into many desktop computers, notebooks, and audio playback devices, notably MP3/WMA players. Other products included microcontrollers for digital appliances, portable compressed video decoders, and TV audio products. The line of audio chips included portable STMP35xx, STMP36xx, and AV capable STMP37xx SoC. A key technology was the advanced device driver support of a broad array of multi-vendor raw NAND flash memory used for program storage and virtual memory in lieu of discrete RAM, AV file storage, and new audio recordings.

The STMP35xx SoC was sold into over 150 million portable media players. Former IBM engineer Dave Baker, Ph.D. EE UTexas Austin, and Texas Instruments alum EE MBA Danny Mulligan led the SoC design team at SigmaTel. Pre-IPO engineer, UTexas Austin Electrical and Computer Engineering alum and Motorola Advanced Media Platforms alum Jonathan L. Nesbitt was STMP35xx SoC Software Development Kit principal lead from 2006 to 2009. Several major contributing principal embedded software engineers from the pre-IPO period included Thor Thayer, ex-Motorolan Jeff Gleason on audio DSP, UT Austin alum Marc Jordan on boot ROM and USB, J.C. Pina, MIT's physicists Gray Abbott and William (Bill) Gordon Ph.D. Others principals formerly with the Motorola Advanced Media Platforms division that later become Freescale's multimedia group included Matt Henson of Carnegie Mellon University and Janna Garafolo. Former Motorolan EE Tom Zudock served as VP of software and managed the software team for the STMP35xx and STMP36xx SDK. Several IC fabs in Asia were utilized to build SoC wafers including TSMC in Taiwan.

Audio encoding and recording to a wide variety of flash memory in MP3 and WAV formats were supported from microphone, SigmaTel FM IC (STFM1000) digital audio source, or line-in. Printed Circuit Board (PCB) layouts and reference schematics were provided to OEM and Original Development Manufacturing (ODM) customers, driving easy manufacturing. Turnkey portable media player custom RTOS, framework, and app software was a large component of the company's success. SigmaTel provided SoC software to equipment manufacturers of portable audio and video player chips.

SigmaTel's audio chips have been found in Dell laptops, several Dell desktops, the Sony Vaio notebook, some of the first Apple MacBooks, and numerous other audio playback devices.

STMP35xx is an audio System-on-a-Chip (SoC) that requires no external RAM, voltage converters, battery chargers, headphone capacitors, analog-to-digital converters, digital-to-analog converters, or amplifiers. Over 150 portable audio product models are based on that STMP35xx SDK3 and over 150 million such portable audio player SoCs were sold from 2002 to 2006.

The first-generation iPod Shuffle used the SigmaTel STMP35xx and its product quality Software Development Kit v2.6. Other products using that SigmaTel SoC and software include the Dell Ditty, Creative MuVo, Philips, and many others. Audio quality for the chip was rated as best in industry. SDK3.1x added Microsoft DRM10 support, enabling interoperability with services such as Rhapsody million song subscription service, Napster, and Yahoo! Music Engine.

== See also ==
- SigmaTel STMP3700
