= D+M Group =

Japanese audio corporation

D+M Group, formerly known as DMGlobal and D&M Holdings, is a Japanese corporation that owned several audio and video brands. It was formed in 2002 from the merger of Denon and Marantz. In February 2004, Forbes reported that D&M was expected to take in $840 million in revenue for the year ending March 2004, earning $15 million profit.

In 2003, D&M acquired Rio and ReplayTV for $36.2 million from the bankruptcy of SonicBlue. D&M placed Rio into a division called 'Digital Networks North America', which also included Escient (acquired April 24, 2003), maker of the FireBall brand media storage and management devices. In July 2005, it sold the division making Rio's electronics to Sigmatel, but retained the rights to the Rio brand. In September of that year, D&M decided to discontinue the Rio brand, stating that there was too much competition in the portable MP3 player market to justify further investment.

Prior to 2008, it was owned by RHJ International, which is associated with Ripplewood Holdings. In 2008, it was acquired by K. K. BCJ-2, a Tokyo corporation owned by investment funds advised by Bain Capital. In August, 2010, Jim Caudill, a former Stanley Black & Decker executive, was named CEO.

In April 2014, D+M Group sold Denon Professional, Marantz Professional, and Denon DJ to inMusic Brands. In February 2017, D+M Group was acquired by American company Sound United LLC.

== Holdings and brands ==
- Boston Acoustics
- D&M Professional
- Denon
- Marantz
- Polk Audio
- Rio (defunct)
- The Speaker Company
