= Listen Up =

Listen Up may refer to:

== Music ==
- Listen Up! (Haley Reinhart album), 2012
- Listen Up! (New Found Glory album), 2026
- Listen Up! The Official 2010 FIFA World Cup Album
- Listen Up, an album by Hoku, 2008
- Listen Up!, an album by Hot Action Cop
- Listen Up!, an album by The Mood Elevator featuring Brendan Benson
- "Listen Up!" (Gossip song), a single by the band the Gossip released in 2006
- "Listen Up", a song by Oasis from "Cigarettes & Alcohol"

== Other ==
- Listen Up (TV series), a 2004–2005 American sitcom that aired on CBS
- Listen UP or 4 Guys 1UP, a gaming podcast on the 1UP Radio Network
- Listen Up!, a Canadian arts outreach program established by the Gryphon Trio
- Listen Up, an early MP3 player from Audio Highway
- ListenUp, consumer electronics company
