= Ixi =

IXI or Ixi can refer to:

- IXI Limited, a British software company that existed from 1987 to 1993
- Ixi software, an experimental project for generative music begun in 2001
- code for Lilabari Airport in North Lakhimpur, Assam, India
- IXI (digital audio player), a prototype for a digital music player invented in 1979
- 1 × 1, a 1944 book of poetry by E. E. Cummings, sometimes stylized I × I

== See also ==
- AIXI
