= Remote Solution =

- Industry: Electronics Manufacturing
- Predecessor: Hango Electronics Co., Ltd.
- Founded: 1994; 31 years ago
- Headquarters: Gimcheon, South Korea
- Website: remotesolution.co.kr

Remote Solution Co., Ltd. is an electronics manufacturer located in Gimcheon, South Korea. The company was founded in 1994 as Hango Electronics Co., Ltd. and assumed its current name in 2002.

Although the company's primary products are handheld remote control devices, it is best known for its "Personal Jukebox" digital audio player. Produced from 2000 until about 2003, the player was developed by and licensed to HanGo Electronics by Compaq. The PJB-100 was the first hard drive-based DAP and was first sold by Remote Solution in 1999.
