= Archos Jukebox =

Digital audio device

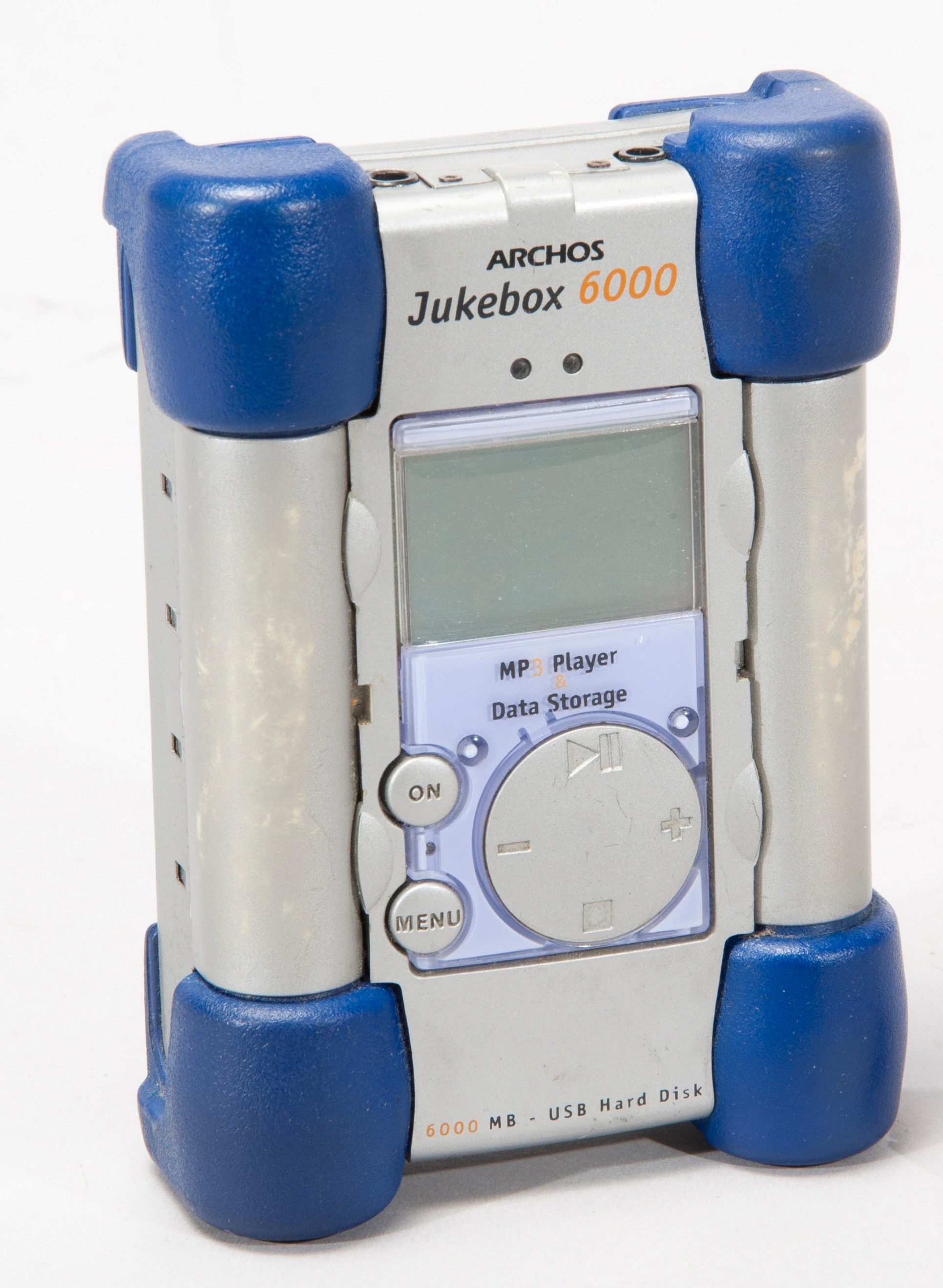
Archos Jukebox 6000

The Archos Jukebox is a series of Archos portable audio players from 2000 to 2002.

== Portable Audio ==
=== Jukebox 5000 and 6000 ===
The Archos Jukebox 6000 was one of Archos' very first players. Containing a 6 GB 2.5" hard drive, this was one of the first of its kind. This player is only MP3 compatible, and was bundled with Musicmatch Jukebox to allow users to rip their music collection onto the jukebox. Users could also copy files straight onto the device without any additional software, which allows the Jukebox 6000 to work on any operating system.

Another model, the Archos Jukebox 5000, was also released. The only difference was the 5 GB 2.5" hard drive; hence the "5000" moniker. This was one of the first hard disk-based portable audio players, and at the time was relatively expensive. The robust and chunky design did somewhat hinder its portability but due to the large disk capacity, the Jukebox proved to be popular. It is also possible to upgrade the hard drive to a larger capacity, higher RPM drive using a standard 2.5" IDE drive. It has also been reported using a CompactFlash-to-IDE adapter and CompactFlash card will allow the use of solid-state storage, which has no moving parts and is less susceptible to damage from drops or sudden movements.

The player came in metallic silver and metallic blue, and was known for the large blue bumpers on its corners. This device also has a 1-bit charcell LCD screen with two lights above showing power and HDD activity. Also, like Archos' other products, this is also connectible to a hifi with its line out source, which was ideal for portable DJs.

The Jukebox 6000, and its successor the Jukebox Studio (see below), used standard USB 1.1 technology, transferring data at a maximum rate of 1 MB per second. These models transfer data at a comparably slow rate compared with succeeding Archos devices using the USB 2.0 standard.

This device was released Saturday, December 9, 2000, and discontinued as of Friday, May 16, 2003. It weighs 350 g.

The Jukebox is historically notable for shipping with a user interface and operating system so unfriendly and bug-ridden as to inspire Björn Stenberg and other programmers to develop a superior, free and open-source replacement operating system. This project became Rockbox.

=== Jukebox Studio ===
The Archos' Jukebox Studio succeeded the Jukebox 6000, the main difference between the two models being the larger hard drive sizes offered. Internally, the two models were the same. The Jukebox Studio was available as a 10 GB, 15 GB, or 20 GB model. (The 15 GB version was short lived.)

The Jukebox Studio was released Thursday, October 4, 2001, and discontinued in 2003. It weighs 350 g.

=== Jukebox Recorder ===
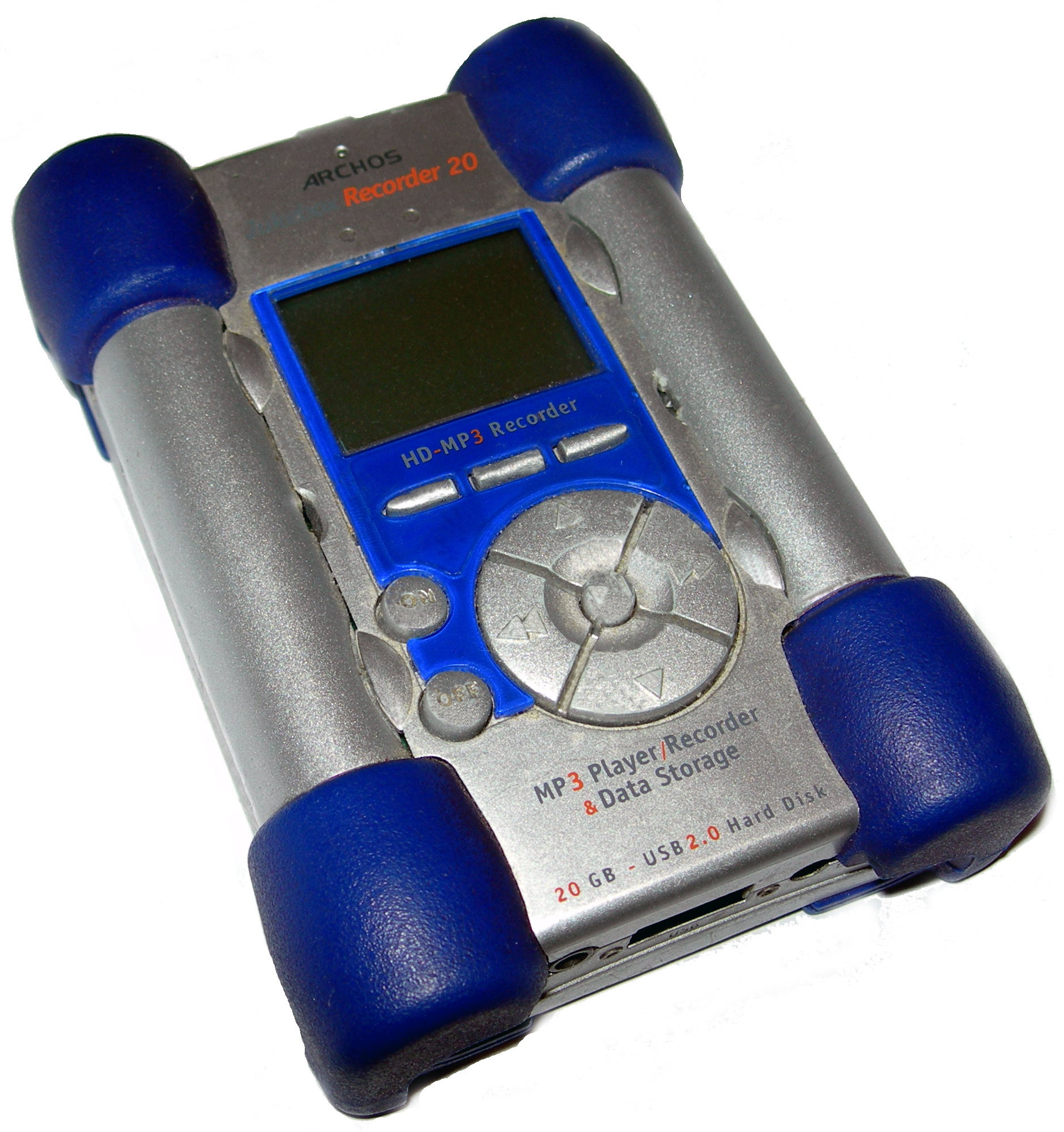
Archos Jukebox Recorder 20 MP3 Player

Archos Jukebox running Rockbox

Archos' Jukebox Recorder was similar to the Player/Studio models, but featured a 112x64 bitmap LCD and recording capabilities. This model is sometimes referred to as the Recorder v1 to differentiate it from the later v2 version which looks quite different. Some confusion exists regarding the speed of the Recorder's USB port. An earlier version of the Recorder contained a USB 1.1 port and a later version provided a USB 2.0 port interface (source: rockbox.org). The two can be somewhat differentiated because earlier Recorder models came with the smaller hard drive capacities: 6, 10, or 15 gb. The later version came with 15 or 20 gb sized hard drives. Owners of Jukebox Recorder 15's thus may or may not have USB 2.0, a significant concern for prospective buyers; but one can tell if it uses USB 2.0 or not by looking for the line "USB 2.0 Hard Disk" along the bottom of the device. Although discontinued, the Jukebox Recorder with USB 2.0 interface remains in some demand because of the enhanced speed of the USB 2.0 connection (in contrast to USB 1.1), the capability of the device to be flashed with the free and open source Rockbox firmware, the device's recording feature, easy to replace AA-sized NiMH batteries, and its use of easily upgradeable 2.5" standard laptop hard drives.

The Jukebox Recorder 20 was released around January 2002. It weighs 350 g.

== Portable Video ==
=== Jukebox Multimedia ===
Jukebox Multimedia
- Storage: 20 GB
- Display: 1.5" LCD with 24-bit color
- Graphics: XviD, DivX 4.0, DivX 5.0, MPEG-4 SP, JPEG and BMP
- Sound: Stereo MP3 decoding @ 30-320 kbit/s
- Connectivity: Audio line-in, Headphones, Audio line-out, Composite video output - RCA, USB, S/PDIF input/output, USB port compatible Mass Storage Device
- Power: Battery: 7 hours
- Dimensions: 80mm x 110mm x 30mm (3.1 in x 4.4 in x 1.2 in)
- Weight: 290g (10.2 oz)

The Jukebox Multimedia is Archos's first multimedia player and considered the first ever portable media player (PMP). It enabled users to record straight from a camera attachment. Also featuring an audio player, an image viewer and video player, as well as the correct cables supplied straight from the box.

The player also has the ability to record audio from a line-in source (cables supplied) straight into MP3 format. The player features a 10 GB Hard Disk Drive (Jukebox 10) or 20 GB (Jukebox 20) and uses DivX MPEG4 format for video recording and playback.

The player uses USB 1.1 technology, though has add-ons for USB 2.0 and Firewire to give quicker transfers of files and data, and is recognized as a USB mass storage device.

This player was released on Friday 5th July 2002, weighing 290 g.

== See also ==
- Archos Gmini series
- Portable media player
- Rockbox
