= Sony NW-A810 =

Sony Walkman NW-A810 Series
- Manufacturer: Sony Corporation
- Type: Portable media player
- Operating system: Sony Proprietary OS
- Storage: 2 GB (NW-A815); 4 GB (NW-A816); 8 GB (NW-A818); Solid-state Drive
- Display: 240x320 2" 262k TFT; LED Backlight
- Connectivity: WM-PORT; USB 2.0 Compliant
- Power: Li-Ion Battery non user replaceable
- Dimensions: 44.5 x 88.0 x 9.6 mm
- Weight: 1.9 oz.
- Predecessor: NW-A800 Series
- Successor: NW-A820 Series
- Related: Walkman; Windows Media Player 11

The Walkman A810 series is a portable media player designed by Sony. It was a flagship model in the Walkman digital player family. The model debuted in Asia in 2007, and then became available in North America. This series updates the previous Walkman A800 of the Walkman A Series, with the same hardware but different on-PC music management program.

Sony released 3 models, the NWZ-A815 (2 GB), NWZ-A816 (4 GB) and NWZ-A818 (8 GB). Some of the enhancements made include compatibility with Windows Media Player 11, and the infamous Drag n' Drop feature, which allowed the user to transfer Music, Photo and Video files quickly, via windows explorer, (using ID-Tags for the song information i.e. album, artist etc.). Sony also removed compatibility with ATRAC which replaced the customers need for SonicStage, with Windows Media Player 11.

In March 2008, Sony launched its successor in United States, the A820, featuring wireless functions and with larger display and memory.

== Design ==
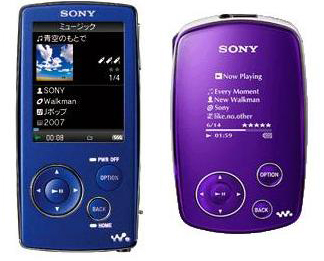
The external design comparison between the Walkman NW-A810 and NW-A1000

This player shares the same hardware and design with Sony NW-A800. The whole body is encased with metal, and has a 2.0" LCD. The three control buttons below the display are specially arranged to make up the Walkman logo on the front. Additionally, there is a chrome-like strip made of polished metal surrounding the device. Overall, the design is in a similar style with Sony's preceding Walkman A series model, NW-A1000/3000, which did not come to sale in United States. Both of them feature a surrounding metal strip and deliberately arranged control buttons to mimic the Walkman logo. The available colors for the NW-A810/800 model are black, white, purple and pink in Japan.

== Operation ==
Navigation is handled via three circular controls on the front of the player: a power/option key, a back/home button, and a four-way control pad surrounding a central play/pause key.A dedicated volume rocker sits on the right edge of the player.
The user interface is composed of nine icons organized in a 3X3 square. Icons Are highlighted and magnified as the user scrolls through them. The operation system offers a searching function, letting user search for a song based on artist, album, release year and genre.

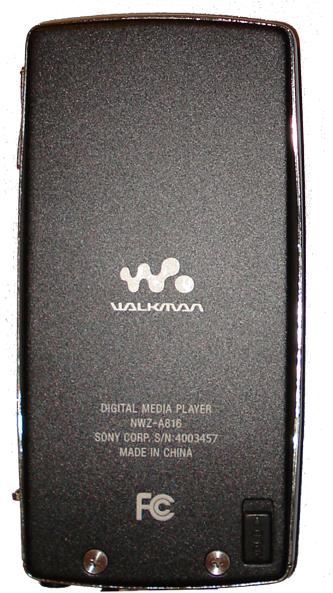
The back view of NW-A810

== Performance ==
DSEE logo

The NW-A810/800 MP3 players have been critically praised for their audio quality, mostly due to its patented Sony technologies such as DSEE (Digital Sound Enhancement Engine) and Clear Stereo. DSEE is claimed to restore higher sound frequency lost when creating compressed MP3 files, to reproduce the CD audio quality.
As well, the MDR-EX082 headphones bundled with the NW-A810 have a high bass response for headphones of its size. It's also tested to have higher-than-average battery life, with 36 hours of audio play and 8 hours of video play.

== Reception ==
Walkman NW-A810 received great acclaim from CNET, which gave the gadget the Editor's Choice Award with a score of 8.0 out of 10, and was rated as "excellent". CNET praised it for its slim design with an ample screen, extraordinary sound quality and fantastic battery life, but criticized its short earphone cable and the placement of the hold button on the back of the player.
Crave, the CNET gadget blog, named the NW-A810 series as one of the MP3 players that shaped year 2007, with another three, the Zune 80, iPod Touch, and the ZEN.

== Differences with Walkman NW-A800 ==
	NW-A800	NW-A810
Audio Format	ATRAC, ATRAC3, ATRAC3Plus; Bitrate : 48-352 kbit/s, Freq : 44.1 kHz; ATRAC Advanced Lossless; Bitrate : 64-352 kbit/s, Freq : 44.1 kHz	Linear PCM; 1,411 kbit/s Freq : 44.1 kHz
Video Format	MPEG-4 Simple Profile, Max bitrate : 2,500 kbit/s H.264/AVC Baseline Profile Level 1.2 & 1.3, Max bitrate : 768 kbit/s	H.264/AVC Baseline Profile Level 1.2 & 1.3, Max bitrate : 768 kbit/s
Gapless Playback	Yes (ATRAC)	No
Software Package	Sonicstage 4.3; Sony Image Converter 3.0	MP3 Conversion Tool; Windows Media Player 11
Capacity (User Available)	NW-A805 : 1.81 GB; NW-A806 : 3.73 GB; NW-A808 : 7.56 GB	NWZ-A815 : 1.71 GB; NWZ-A816 : 3.57 GB; NWz-A818 : 7.30 GB

Hardware-wise, NW-A800 and NW-A810 are identical. The main difference laid on the firmware which affect audio format support and music management software. Unless mentioned specifically above, the rest of specification is exactly the same for both devices.

== See also ==
- Walkman
- Sony
- Sony Connect
- Sony Ericsson
- Adaptive Transform Acoustic Coding
