= IXI (digital audio player) =

The IXI was the world's first digital audio player. It was invented by Kane Kramer in 1979.

In 1981 Kramer filed for a UK patent. UK patent 2115996 was issued in 1985, and U.S. Patent 4,667,088 was issued in 1987. In 1988 Kramer's failure to raise the £60,000 required to renew the patent resulted in the patent entering the public domain, but he is still the owner of the designs.

IXI was around the size of a credit card and had a LCD screen and navigation and volume buttons. Four prototype models were built and a pre-production model went on sale at the APRS exhibition at Earls Court in London, in October 1986.
