= Nathan Schulhof =

Nathan M. Schulhof
- Nathan and Audio Highway's Listen Up player
- Occupation(s): Executive Vice President, Solar Components, LLC
- Website: Solar Components, LLC

Nathan M. Schulhof is a technology industry entrepreneur with a career that spans over three decades. Schulhof is listed as the lead inventor on three U.S. patents (5,557,541; 5,572,442 and 5,841,979).

However, Schulhof is also listed as co-inventor on another U.S. patent (6,549,942), and a fifth U.S. patent (5,914,941) references 5,557,541 and was assigned (as were the other four patents) to Audio Highway Media Corporation (a company co-founded and led by Schulhof when the patents were filed and/or issued). Audio Highway's Listen Up player, the father of the MP3 player, won an Innovation Award from the Consumer Electronics Show in 1997 and a 1998 People's Choice Award at the 2nd annual Internet Showcase conference, held Jan. 30, 1998, and presented by Upside Media, Inc. and event host and co-founder, David Coursey.Because of his very early patents for a downloadable portable media player, Schulhof is often thought of as the father of the MP3 player.

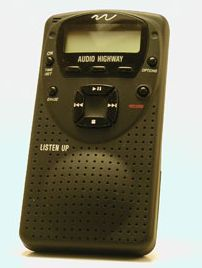
Audio Highway's Listen Up player

These patents, along with the remaining assets of audiohighway.com, were acquired in 2003 by Sony Corp.

In addition to his career with Information Highway Media Corp. (later renamed Audio Highway and then audiohighway.com) where Schulhof served as president, CEO and board member, he has also held executive positions with HandHeld Entertainment, TestDrive Corporation, Silicon Valley Systems and Jasmine Systems.

Schulhof co-founded Solar Components, LLC, a Silicon Valley–based firm in the solar power industry. Originally from the Pittsburgh, Pennsylvania, area, Schulhof currently resides in Southern California.
