= Zen (portable media player) =

Portable media player by Creative Technology

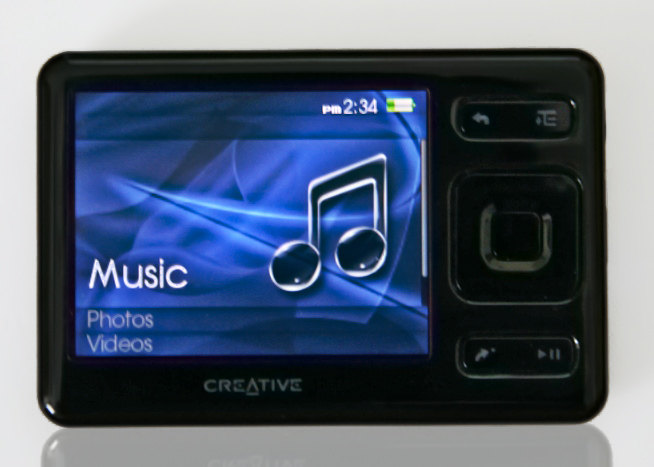
- Manufacturer: Creative Technology
- Type: Portable media player
- Released: September 2007
- Operating system: ZEN UI 1.21.03
- System on a chip: SigmaTel / Freescale Semiconductor STMP3760
- Storage: Available in 2, 4, 8, 16, and 32 GB flash memory
- Display: 2.5 in (64 mm) backlit TFT LCD Screen; 320 × 240 resolution 24-bit color depth (16.7 million colors)
- Input: 4-way directional pad, 9 buttons, power/hold slider
- Connectivity: USB 2.0

The ZEN is a portable media player in the Creative Zen series designed and manufactured by Creative Technology. This flash memory-based player is the de facto successor of the ZEN Vision:M and was announced on August 29, 2007, to be available in capacities of 2, 4, 8, and 16 GB, as of September 14. A 32 GB model was announced on December 4, 2007, setting a record for storage capacity among flash players. The ZEN is referred to also by the identifier DVP-FL0001 which appears on the bottom-left of the unit in gray text.

The player has a width of 83 mm (3.3 in), a height of 55 mm (2.2 in) and is 11.3 mm (0.44 in) thick, making it the slimmest Creative portable media player and the second slimmest Creative player of any type (other than the discontinued MuVo Slim) at the time of its release. Because of its dimensions, the ZEN is advertised to be the "size of a credit card". This is the first Creative player to have a SD card slot (enabling the support of SD and SDHC cards; an optional adapter is needed for microSD and miniSD cards), support for DRM free iTunes-encoded AAC (in a ".m4a" extension), as well as a truecolor TFT LCD.

== Specifications ==
ZEN
Feature	Description
Capacity	2/4/8/16/32 GB
Memory type	Flash-based
Dimensions	82 × 54 × 11 mm/3.26 × 2.16 × 0.44 in
Weight	65 g (2.3 oz)
Screen	2.5 in (64 mm) TFT LCD
Screen resolution	320 × 240 pixels (QVGA)
Color depth	24-bit (16.7 million colors)
Battery life	Audio playback: >30 hr Video playback: >5 hr
Video formats	MJPEG, WMV, and AVI (MPEG-4 SP, DivX, Xvid), while MPEG-1, and MPEG-2 are supported, but must be transcoded with the included software (Video must not exceed the player's screen resolution at 320 × 240 pixels). ZEN MX: AVI, WMV, MP4, MPG, ASF, MOV, M4V, DAT (all transcoded into Creative's proprietary CMV format)
Audio formats	MP3, iTunes-encoded AAC (unprotected ".m4a"), WMA (including protected), not in ZEN MX: WAV and Audible 2, 3, and 4 formats
Photo formats	JPEG (other formats would be transcoded)
Battery	Non-removable, rechargeable lithium-ion battery
Signal-to-noise ratio	Up to 97 dB
EQ types	Pop, jazz, rock, disco, vocal, new age, classical, acoustic, and 5-band custom setting
Album art source	ID3 tag/jpeg file in album folder
Microphone input quota	10 hr
FM radio presets	32
Connection type	USB 1.1/2.0, SD memory card
PIM	Synchronises with Microsoft Outlook contacts, calendar, and tasks
System requirements	Windows 7, Windows Vista or XP. For Linux, see libmtp. (Limited native support as a mass storage device is available on Ubuntu 9.04+, and possibly other Linux distributions.) Third-party programs such as XNJB add transfer-only Mac OS X compatibility.

== SD card functionality ==
The SD card acts as a separate storage volume with reduced features relative to the internal storage volume. SD card content does not appear under the regular menus Music, Artists, Albums, etc., appearing only on a separate "Memory Card" menu item which offers a folder-file browser. Add to Selected, Save As Playlist, Bookmarks etc. are unavailable for SD card content. Playlists stored on SD card cannot be played. This is considered poor by some reviewers expecting the SD card to function as an expansion of the internal storage.

Though an Import All command makes copies of SD card tracks to internal memory, it fails to index them (even after Clean Up) hence leaving them completely inaccessible.

An advantage of SD card over internal storage is file transfer to the SD card does not require specialist software e.g. can be done by copy and paste from Windows Explorer, either to the card in a PC slot, or to the card in the player slot with the player connected by USB to PC whereupon the card is available as an MSC device.

== Firmware releases ==
Numerous firmware updates were released very soon after the player's launch, fixing a variety of bugs.

The earlier versions have reportedly caused players to occasionally result in a white screen of death.

Version 1.10.05 was released on October 23, 2007. Thai language support was added, while video playback was improved. Adapter charging and startup time were quickened.

The prior version, 1.20.02, was released on December 19, 2007. Transferring content via the SD card slot is enabled, though only image files are viewable.

Firmware version 1.21.01 was released on February 28, 2008. It improves the player's playback performance of WMA (.wma) files.

The latest version, 1.21.03, was released on January 19, 2009, which improves FM radio player operation.

=== Territory variants ===
Units shipped in the EU after a certain date have a different variant of the firmware. The version number is suffixed by the letter "e" e.g. 1.21.01e, 1.21.03e.

In the "e" variant, the output level is reduced by approx 6dB i.e. at the maximum setting, 25, the volume is that of the non-"e" variant's setting 20. This is independent of Audio Settings' Restrict Volume. This variant appeared following an EU Commission proposal to address hearing health concerns by requiring a limit on music player output level. The two firmware variants are interchangeable, meaning the a unit's reduced limit may be removed by reprogramming with the non-"e" variant.

== Undocumented features ==
Recovery Mode > Clean Up restores user settings to factory defaults, something that neither Recovery Mode > Format nor Windows Explorer Format does.

== AAC Support ==
Creative states that the ZEN supports the AAC audio format. However, only iTunes-encoded files can be played by the player hardware. iTunes's implementation has been licensed by Apple from Dolby and is proprietary. These files are in the .m4a format, which is the same as the Apple Lossless Audio Codec. Creative has acknowledged this issue in a support article.

The latest version of Nero-AAC Encoder (1.3.3.0) "solved compatibility issues with some hardware devices", including ZEN. This update makes Nero-Coded AAC files playable on ZEN.

== ZEN MX ==
The ZEN MX is a derivative of the ZEN launched in 2009. The form factor is similar to the ZEN's, being slightly less than a millimeter thicker at 11.9 mm (0.47 inches). There are a notable feature differences. The ZEN MX does not support .AVI, .MPG, or .AAC files natively. In order for them to be played back on the device, they must be transcoded using the bundled converter. The ZEN MX's button layout is slightly altered, merging the play/pause button with the power button. The ZEN MX extends importing from SD card to internal memory and library beyond the ZEN's picture import mode, adding music. The ZEN MX features the MSC/UMS transfer system that makes the player compatible with Apple computers. The ZEN MX user interface is not as promptly responsive to button presses as the ZEN's.

Neither ZEN MX's nor ZEN's firmware can be installed on the other device.

== See also ==
- Creative ZEN
- Creative Technology
- Portable media player
