= ZEN Vision:M =

Portable media player

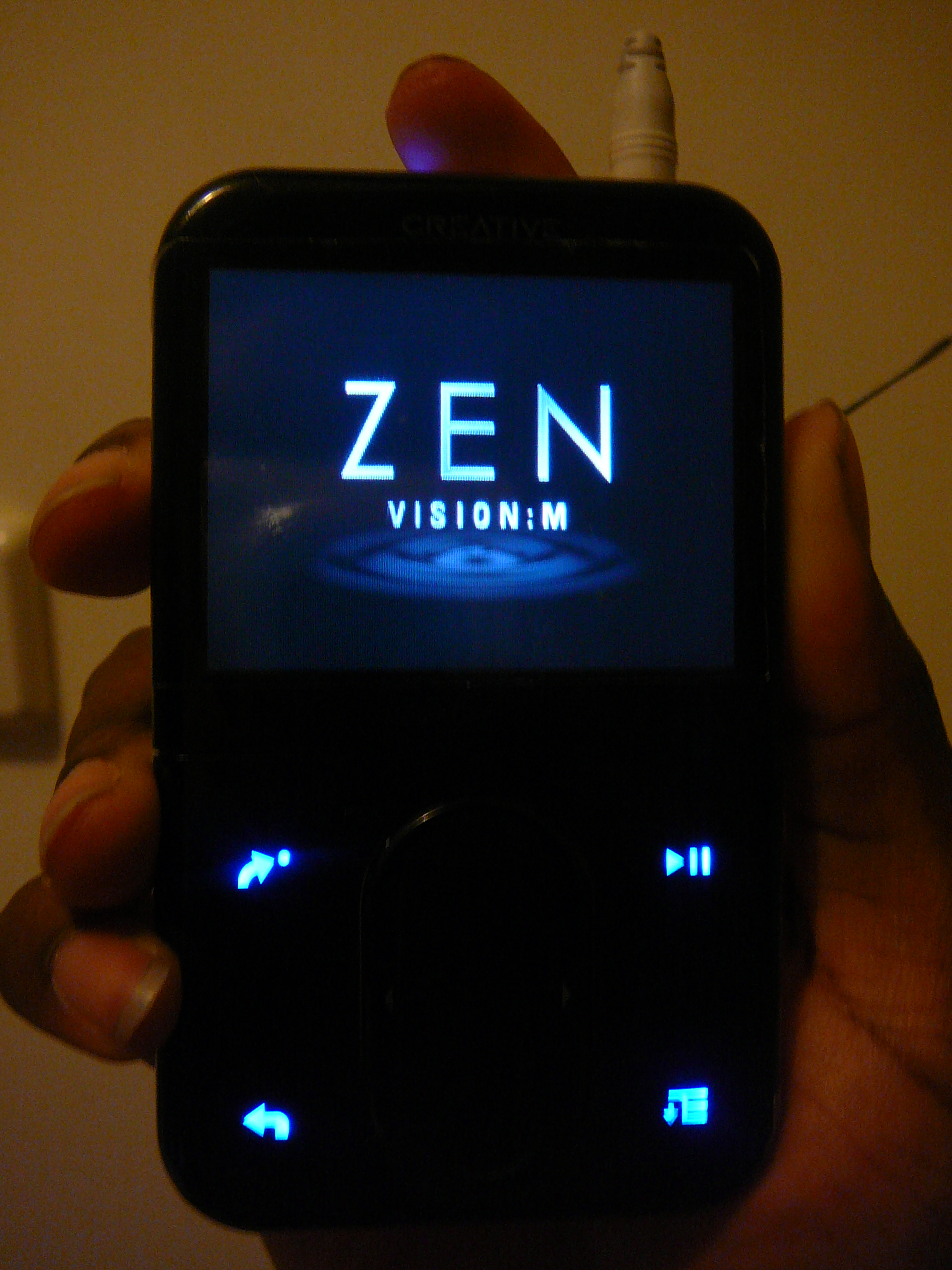
- Manufacturer: Creative Technology
- Type: Digital audio player
- Lifespan: 2005-2007
- Operating system: ZEN UI
- Storage: Available in 30 and 60 GB hard drive
- Display: 2.5" backlit TFT LCD Screen; 320 × 240 resolution 18-bit color depth (262,144 colors)
- Input: TouchPad (Black pad for black model and white for the others), four blue backlit buttons, Power/Hold slider
- Connectivity: USB 2.0

The ZEN Vision:M is a portable media player developed by Creative Technology, launched on December 8, 2005. The device's features and interface were adapted from the earlier released ZEN Vision with a smaller screen size and dimensions.

The player is capable of audio playback, including audiobook files from Audible.com (as of firmware version 1.41.01), video playback (DivX, AVI, Xvid, MPEG-1, MPEG-2, MPEG-4 SP, WMV9 and MJPEG), mostly through external conversion via bundled software, and image display in JPEG (BMP, GIF, PNG, TIFF could be converted).

Both the 30 GB model and the 60 GB contain a built-in recordable FM radio tuner. The feature to record was pulled by a firmware update, but was reinstated in a further update in the 30 GB model only.

The ZEN Vision:M won Best of Show and Best Portable Audio & Video Device awards at the 2006 Consumer Electronics Show, as well as the Red Dot Design Award. Months later, a 60 GB model of the player was released, which included a USB host that allowed users to transfer photos from a digital camera to the Zen Vision.

On March 11, 2007, slimmer versions of the 60 GB models of the ZEN Vision:M and ZEN Vision W were released by Creative, making the players as slim as their 30 GB counterparts.

In September 2007, Creative announced the discontinuation of the ZEN Vision:M, making way for the flash-based ZEN.

== Awards ==
- Best in Show Award - (CNET.com, January 2006)
- Best of CES 2006 - MP3 and Portable Video category (CNET.com, January 2006)
- Best of CES 2006 - Portable Video category (Laptop, January 2006)
- Editor's Choice Award (PC Gamer, May 2006)
- World Class Award (PC World, July 2006)

== Specifications ==
ZEN Vision:M
Feature	Description
Capacity	30 GB (has ability to record FM radio) / 60 GB (has USB Host)
Memory type	Hard drive
Dimensions	104 × 62 × 18.6 mm (4.09 × 2.44 × 0.73 in.)
Weight	163 g (5.75 oz.)
Screen	2.5-inch TFT LCD
Screen resolution	320 × 240 pixels
Color depth	18-bit (262,144 colors)
Battery life	Audio playback > 14hrs (30 GB) / 17hrs (60 GB); Video playback > 4hrs (30 GB) / 5hrs (60 GB)
Charging time	6hrs (2.5hrs through optional power adapter)
Container formats	AVI
Video formats	DivX / Xvid 4.x / 5.x, MPEG-1, MPEG-2, MPEG4-SP, WMV9, Motion-JPEG
Audio formats	MP3, WMA (including protected WMA), WAV,
Photo formats	JPEG, up to 16 megapixels (BMP, GIF, and TIFF with included conversion software)
Battery	Replacing voids warranty, rechargeable Li-Ion battery
Signal-to-noise ratio	Up to 96dB
Harmonic distortion Output	<0.1%
Frequency response	20 Hz - 20 kHz
EQ types	Acoustic, Classical, Disco, Jazz, New Age, Pop, Rock, and Vocal & 5-band custom setting
Album art source	Folder.jpg or Direct Album Art ID3 tag on MP3 file
Audio output	3.5 mm stereo mini-jack, built-in speaker for clicker
Video output	Composite TV-Out: supports NTSC and PAL systems (720 by 576 pixels)
Recording input quota	10hrs
FM radio presets	32
Connection type	USB1.1 / 2.0, MTP
Removable disk quota	16 GB (30 GB) / 32 GB (60 GB) Though media files may be uploaded to the device, they can not be accessed.
PIM	Syncs with Microsoft Outlook Contacts, Calendar & Tasks
System requirements	Windows Vista or XP (Compatible with Windows 2000, Me, and 98SE when this driver is installed.

== See also ==
- Creative ZEN
- Creative Technology
