= Zvm =

Zvm may refer to:

- ZEN Vision:M, The ZEN Vision:M portable media player developed by Creative Technology
- z/VM, IBM's VM family of virtual machine operating systems
