= Dell Digital Jukebox =

Digital audio player

Dell DJ
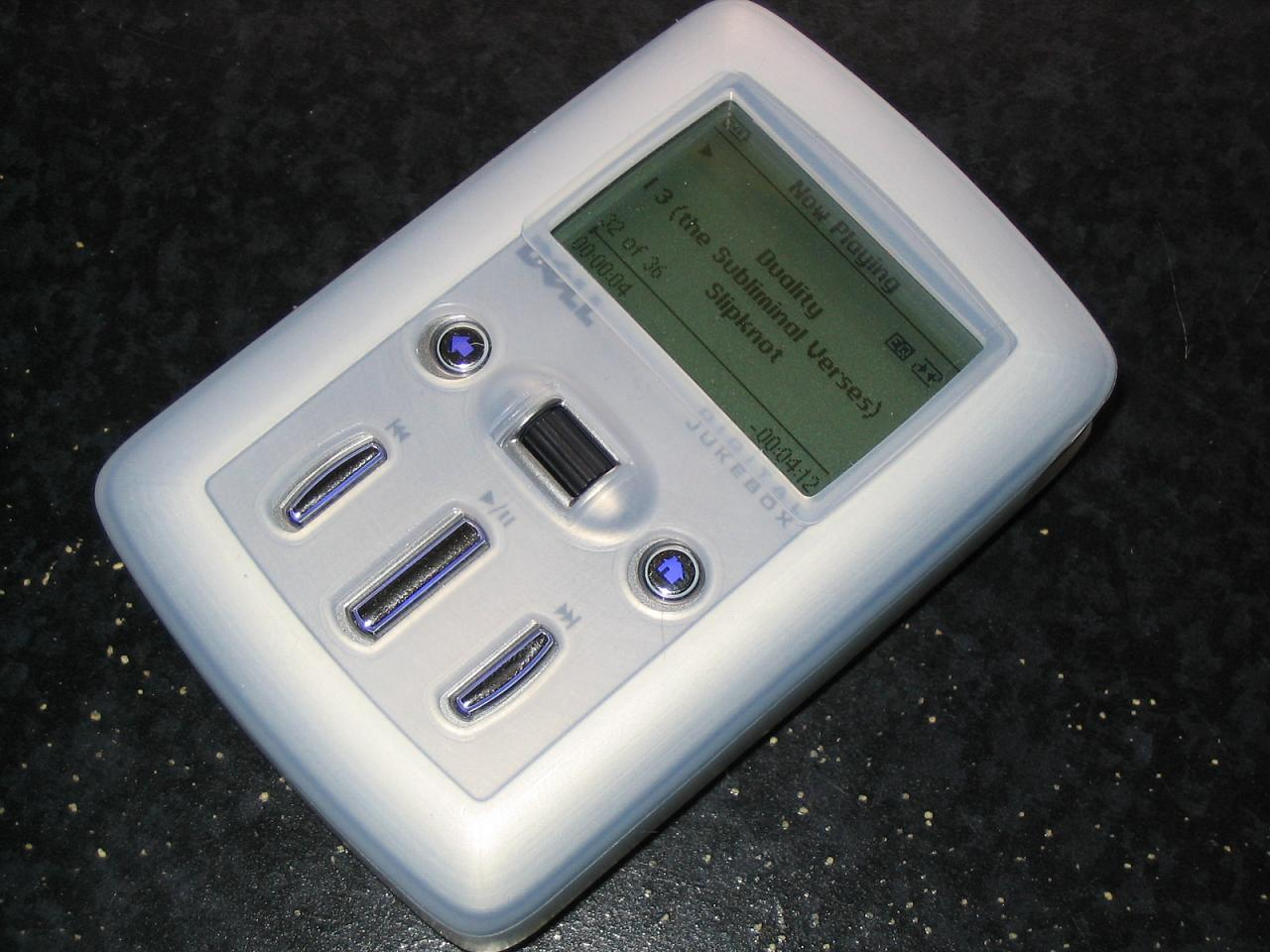
- Dell DJ

The Dell Digital Jukebox or just Dell DJ is a discontinued series of digital audio players sold by the Dell corporation.

== Production ==
The Dell DJs were engineered by Creative Technology and based on the same hardware and software platform as their Creative NOMAD/Creative Zen digital audio players. For example, these devices also used a single TMS320DA25x processor as the main CPU, and the user interface such as the menus, playlists etc. was very much the same.

On February 7, 2006, Dell announced the end of production of hard drive players and continued to only sell their flash-based player, the DJ Ditty. Dell spokesman Liem Nguyen commented, "We transitioned our lineup away from hard drives to focus on flash players." On August 24 of that same year, Dell announced that they also discontinued the DJ Ditty in the face of competition from Apple, manufacturer of the iPod, and other MP3 player manufacturers. "It (DJ Ditty) will end of life and when the supply runs out we will not have a follow-on product to that music player," Dell spokesperson Venancio Figueroa said. According to PCMag, Dell discontinued the Digital Jukebox line made by Creative Technology in 2006.

In a strategic U-turn, many Dell executives confirmed in July 2008 that Dell would be launching a new music player as early as September 2008 that would not compete on the price of hardware, but would instead have a strong online musical shopping experience. However, this new music player never appeared.

== Models ==
=== History ===
- The first generation of Dell Digital Jukeboxes started out with two models: a 15 GB version for about $199 and the 20 GB version that cost $279 according to a 2004 Reader's Digest commercial. These initial models featured voice recording; MP3, protected and unprotected WMA, WAV file playback; and use as an external hard drive (pending driver installation).
- The introduction of the second generation of Dell digital jukeboxes began with 5 GB Dell Pocket DJ (see below). Features unique to this second generation of players were its smaller physical size and firmware that achieved Microsoft PlaysForSure certification. Since then, Dell has produced 15 GB, 20 GB and 30 GB versions of their players.
- In September 2005, Dell introduced the Dell DJ Ditty, a 512 MB flash memory based player. Features unique to this model (apart from its storage medium) were smaller physical size and integrated FM tuner.
- On October 11, 2005, it was revealed that, both Sirius and XM (with partner Samsung) will offer an MP3 satellite player that fall. Dell then announced that it would upgrade to a third-generation DJ and Pocket DJ with capability to play XM radio streams pre-recorded on an accompanying dock system. A color screen would replace the monochrome display.
- On February 6, 2006, it was announced that Dell discontinued their hard drive based players, and will not release any future models at this time.
- On August 18, 2006, Dell discontinued production of the Dell DJ Ditty.

=== Dell Pocket DJ ===
The Dell Pocket DJ is a pocket sized player released by Dell in 2004. It has 5 GB of memory, capable of holding 2,500 songs. It retailed for $199, which was the same price as the now discontinued 4 GB Apple iPod Mini. The Pocket DJ has a 10-hour battery life and charges through a USB plug either through the computer or electrical outlet.

The Pocket DJ is compatible with many music stores and formats, such as WMA (Windows Media Audio), and MP3. It also sports a blue 160 by 104 pixel screen, although easy for most people to read in the daylight, it can be difficult to read at night, because the blue reduces the clarity of the screen. The buttons also light up on the front, providing easy navigation. The buttons include, Back, Home, Previous/Rewind, Play/Pause, and Next/FastForward.

The interface looks similar to the Creative Zen Micro, except the Pocket DJ does not have voice recording or FM tuner.

Similar to the iPod's click wheel, the Pocket DJ has a small scroll barrel that can be used to scroll through playlists, etc. When a user scrolls to a song, they push down on the barrel and a menu comes up asking the user if they want to play the song, add it to a playlist, delete it, etc. The pop-up menu can be bypassed by pushing the Play/Pause button.

=== Dell DJ 20 and Dell DJ 30 ===
The Pocket DJ has three siblings: the DJ 20, which holds 20 GB of music; DJ 30, which holds 30 GB of music; and the DJ Ditty, a flash-based player which holds 512 MB of music.

=== Dell Ditty ===
The Dell Ditty was a small player that had 512 MB of flash memory and a built in FM tuner. It had a small screen showing the currently playing track. MP3 files could be dragged and dropped into the player through Windows Explorer. The player did not offer file choosing, just playback in order or random "shuffle" and repeat. Different color caps were available for purchase from Dell. The Ditty was discontinued in August 2006.

== Software ==
=== Dell software ===
Dell supplies two pieces of software with the purchase of a Digital Jukebox: The "basic" version of Musicmatch Jukebox and Dell DJ Explorer. The Musicmatch Jukebox software is used to copy, manage, and transfer music to the Dell DJ while the Dell DJ Explorer allows for the Dell DJ to be used as an external hard drive and provide more intuitive procedures to renaming, reordering, and simply putting songs on the music player by copying and pasting songs from the hard drive into the mp3 player.

=== Third-party software ===
Beside the Dell included DJ Explorer program that is used to transfer music and data, there are other transfer and track/file management programs

- Free software:
  - Amarok is a music player for Linux
  - Creative Nomad Jukebox KIO::Slave is an integration driver for KDE which should also work with the Dell DJs.
  - Gnomad is a DJ Manager for Linux
  - Neutrino is another DJ Manager for Linux
  - Nomadsync is a DJ synchronization tool for Linux
  - XNJB is a DJ Manager for Mac OS X 10.3 and later
- Proprietary software:
  - Deubox Explorer (formerly known as Dudebox Explorer) by Red Chair Software is a transfer program for Microsoft Windows. This $25 program includes a file streamer and with the ability to convert an MP3 player into a file server that is accessible over the Internet. The Deubox Explorer and RedChair software have, as a whole, stopped supporting their customers and can no longer register legally purchased software to use.

== See also ==
- Creative NOMAD
- Creative ZEN
