= Creative Nomad =

Range of digital audio players

The Nomad was a range of digital audio players designed and sold by Creative Technology Limited, and later discontinued in 2004. Subsequent players now fall exclusively under the MuVo and ZEN brands.

The Nomad series consisted of two distinct brands:

- Nomad (and later Nomad MuVo) - Players that use flash memory. This brand eventually became the MuVo line.
- Nomad Jukebox - Players that used laptop hard drives, and microdrives in later models. The brand evolved into the Zen line.

== Nomad and Nomad MuVo ==
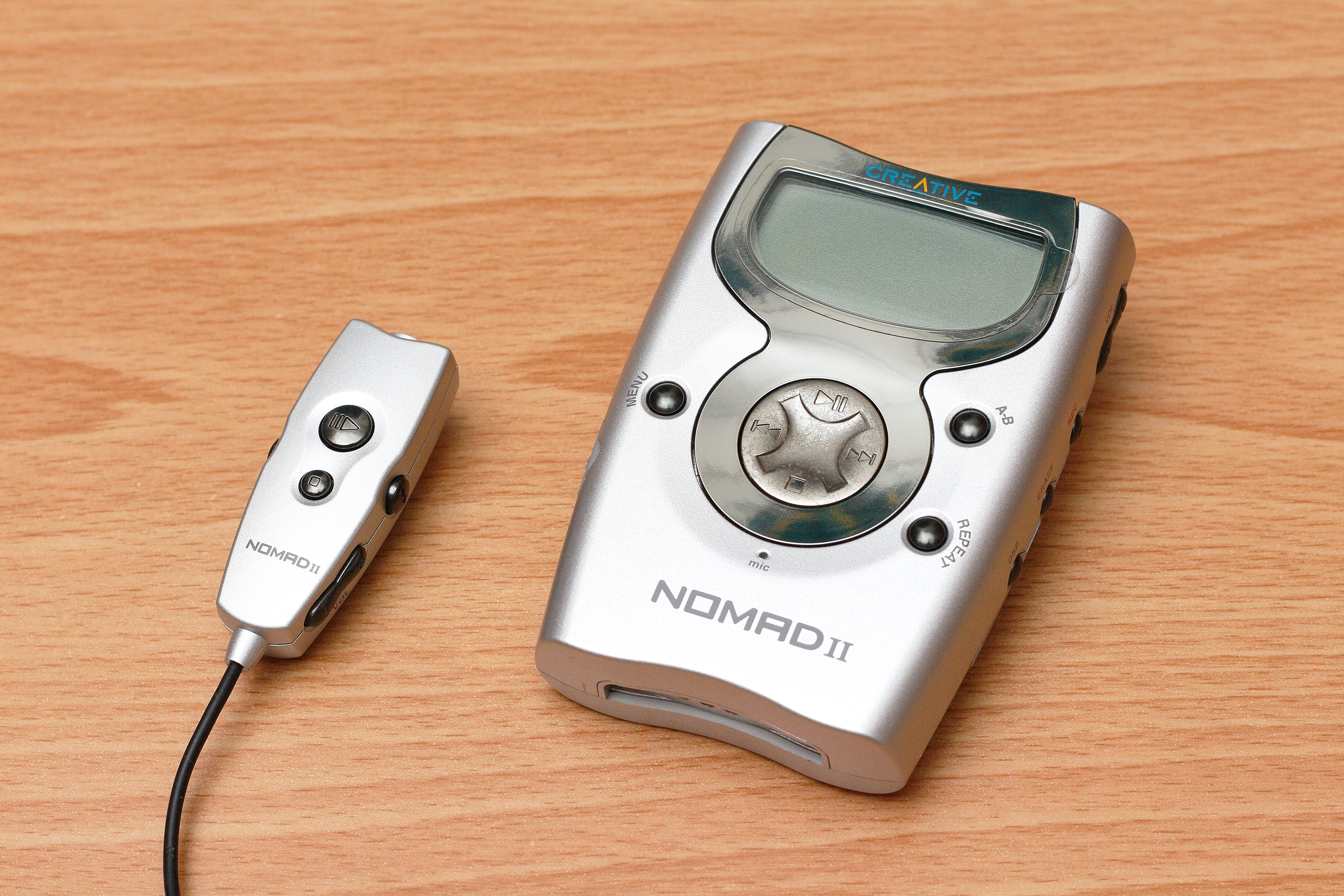
The Nomad II runs off one AA battery and uses SmartMedia memory cards.

These models appear as a USB mass storage device to the operating system so that the device can be accessed like any other removable disk, a floppy disk for example. Older MuVo devices and all Jukebox models use a custom protocol named PDE (Portable Digital Entertainment, a Creative internal device designation) that requires the installation of drivers before the device can be recognised by the operating system.

Creative's foray into the MP3 player market began with the Nomad NOMAD, a rebranded Samsung Electronics Yepp YP-D40 player with 64 megabytes of solid-state memory.

IEEE 1284 Parallel port connection

- Creative Nomad

USB 1.1 connection

- Creative Nomad II - Included FM radio and 64 MB of memory via bundled SmartMedia Card. 32 MB Internal Memory.
- Creative Nomad IIc - Same appearance as Nomad II, but with no FM radio and 64 MB or 128 MB internal memory.
- Creative Nomad II MG
- Creative Nomad MuVo
- Creative Nomad MuVo NX

USB 2.0 connection

- Creative Nomad MuVo2
- Creative Nomad MuVo2 X-Trainer
- Creative Nomad MuVo2 FM
- Creative Nomad MuVo USB 2.0
- Creative Nomad MuVo TX
- Creative Nomad MuVo TX (Second Edition)
- Creative Nomad MuVo TX FM
- Creative Nomad Muvo Micro V200
- Creative Nomad MuVo Micro v100
- Creative Nomad Muvo Micro N200

== Nomad Jukebox Zen ==
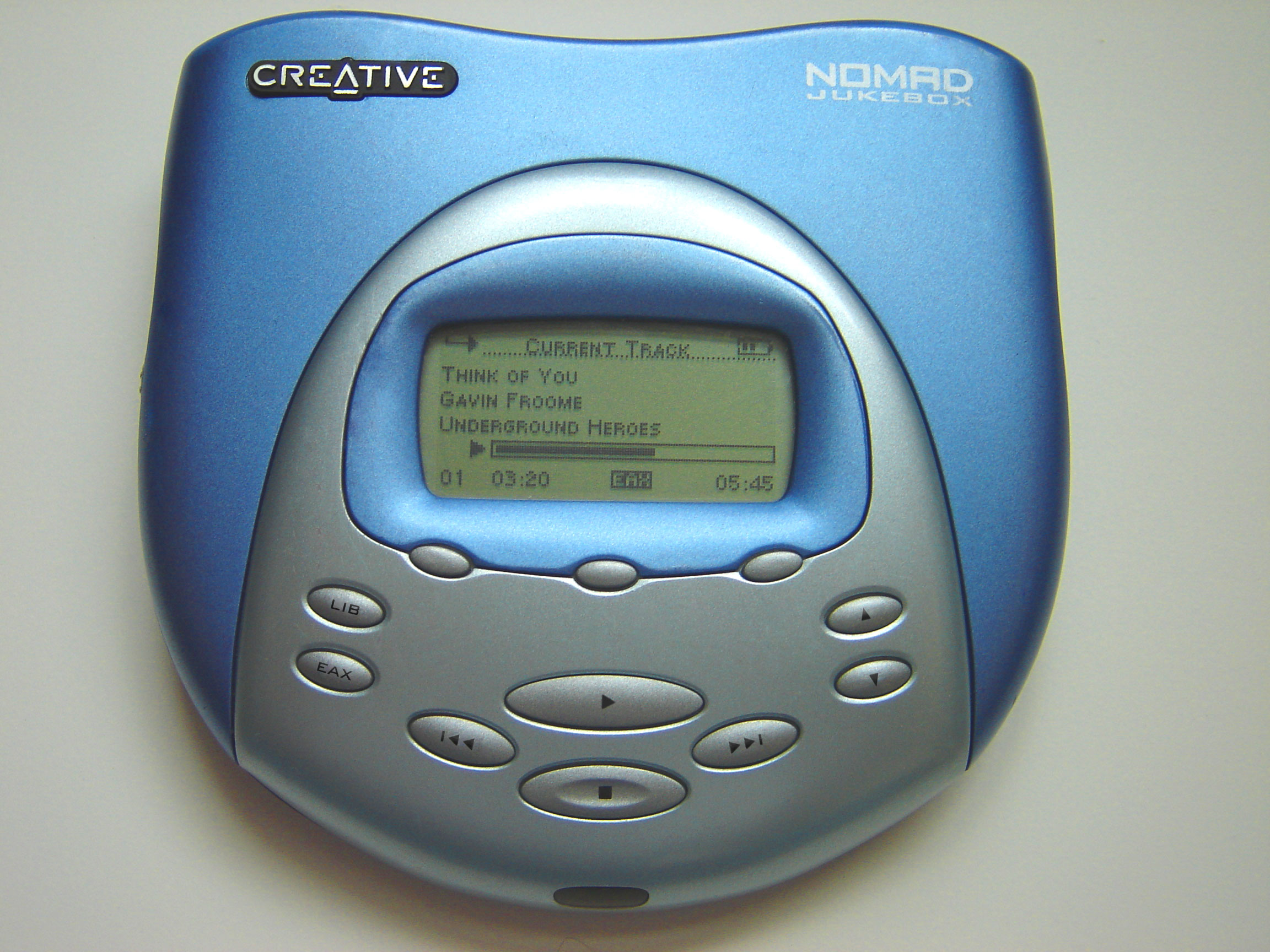
The Nomad Jukebox runs on four AA batteries and has a 6 GB hard drive.

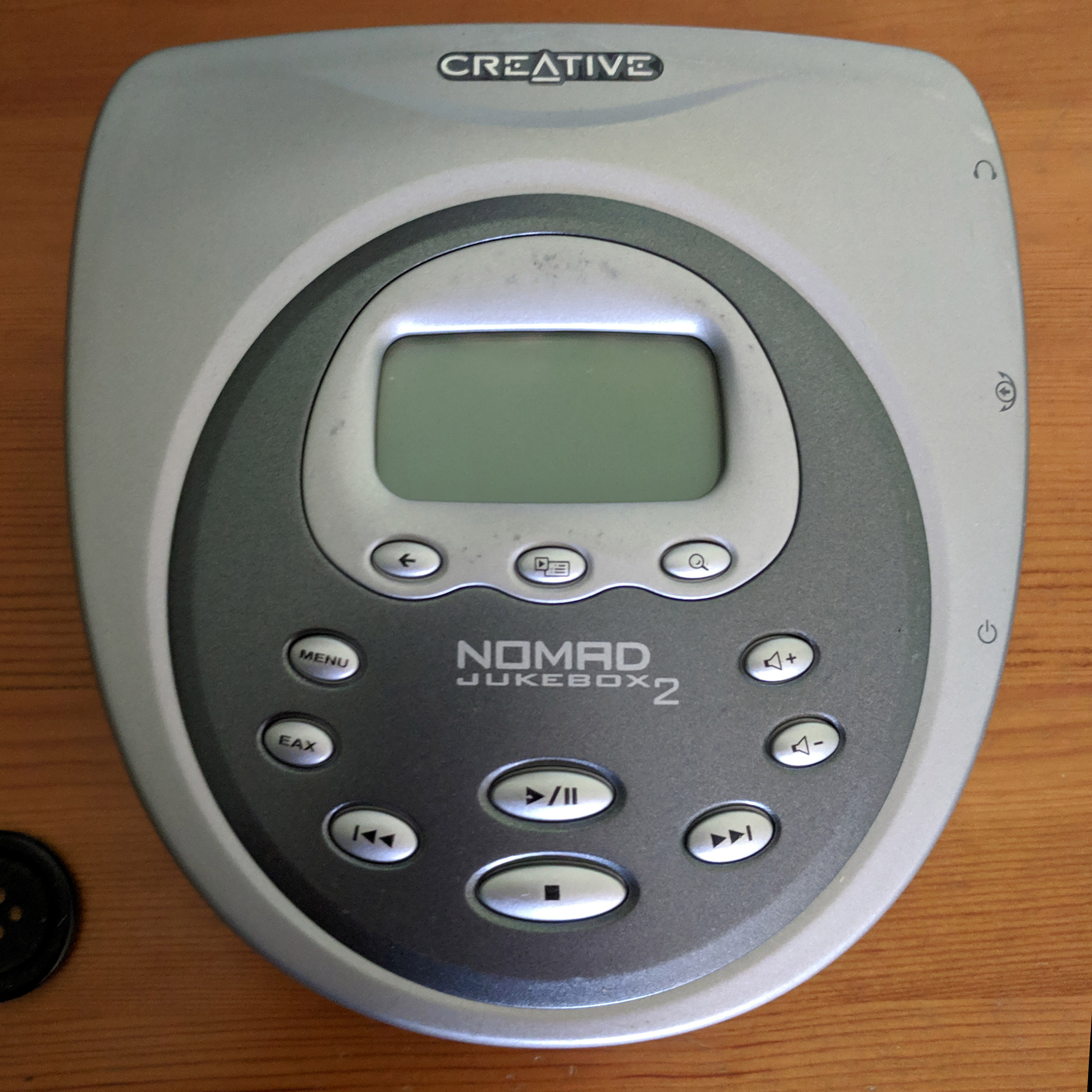
NOMAD Jukebox 2

Later NOMAD Jukeboxes used Creative's own firmware. Most players use Texas Instruments TMS320DA25x ARM plus digital signal processor as their CPU and support some version of Creative's environmental audio extensions (EAX). It beat Apple Computer's hard drive music player "iPod" to market by about a year.

The Nomad Jukeboxes have varied in their use of connections. The Jukebox 3 and Jukebox Zen were unusual in their use of the older USB 1.1 standard despite their predecessor, the Nomad Jukebox 2, having used the newer USB 2.0 standard. Part of the reason for this was the inclusion of a FireWire connection, which is of comparable speed to USB 2.0.

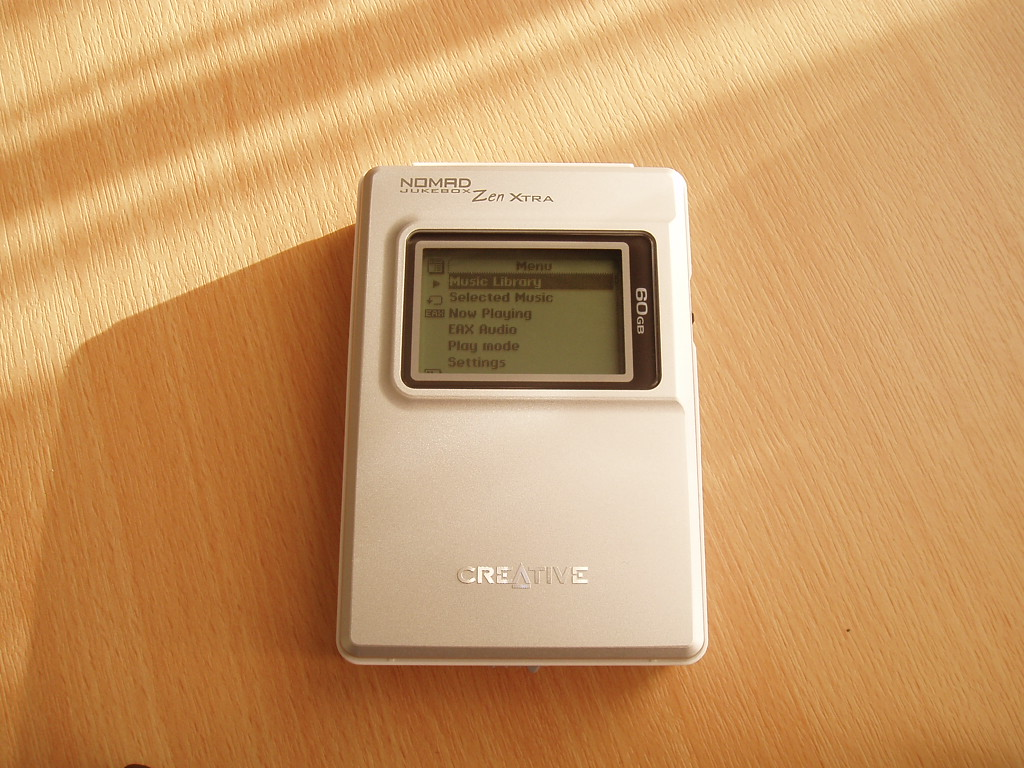
NOMAD Jukebox Zen Xtra (60GB)

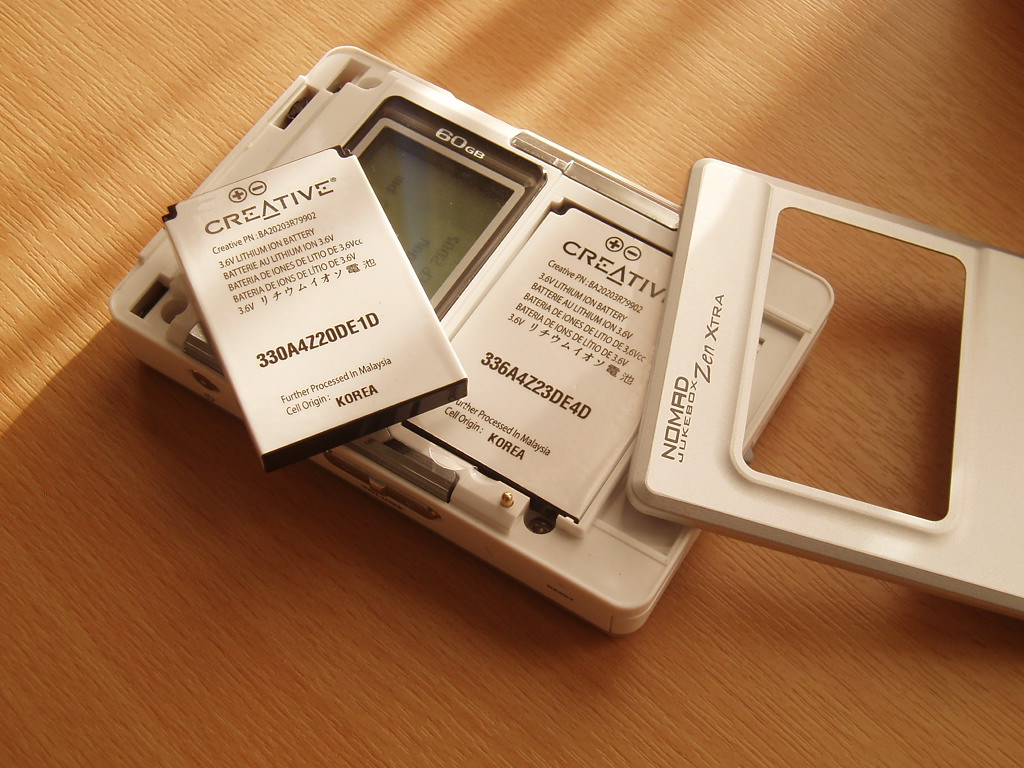
NOMAD Jukebox Zen players feature easily replaceable batteries

USB 1.1 connection

- Creative Nomad Jukebox (Creative Digital Audio Player in Europe)
- Creative Nomad Jukebox 3 (also features a FireWire connection)
- Creative Nomad Jukebox Zen (also features a FireWire connection)

USB 2.0 connection

- Creative Nomad Jukebox 2
- Creative NomadJukebox Zen USB 2.0
- Creative Nomad Jukebox Zen NX
- Creative Nomad Jukebox Zen Xtra

A variant of the Nomad Jukebox was also sold as an OEM product by Dell under the name Dell Digital Jukebox (Dell DJ), a USB 2.0 device. The Second Generation Dell DJ and Dell Pocket DJ 5 are also OEM products from Creative.

The Nomad Jukebox shipped in the U.S. in September 2000. By January 2001, Creative reported that it had sold 100,000 units.

Future versions in the Creative ZEN line exclusively use Microsoft's Media Transfer Protocol (also known as PlaysForSure), and some legacy devices have been supplied with firmware upgrades to support MTP. The first Nomad player and the first Nomad Jukebox use proprietary protocols, neither PDE or MTP.

== Related software ==
Besides the Nomad Explorer or MediaSource programs included with the devices, there are other programs which can be used to manage the player and to transfer data.

Bundled software

- Creative Nomad Explorer - Software included with older Nomad models and used to transfer music and data to the device. This has since been replaced by Creative MediaSource
- Creative MediaSource - A fully featured audio player for Microsoft Windows that also manages Nomad devices and can be used to transfer media to the device or to synchronise playlists with the device - a feature that was unavailable in the previous Nomad Explorer software.

== See also ==
- Creative Technology Limited
- Creative Zen
- Creative MuVo
