= ZEN Vision W =

Portable media player

Creative Zen Vision W
- Manufacturer: Creative Technology
- Type: Portable Media Player Digital Audio Player
- Released: September 14, 2006; 19 years ago
- Operating system: ZEN Vision W UI v1.10.01
- CPU: Texas Instruments TMS320
- Display: 4.3" WQVGA wide aspect high-resolution TFT LCD screen 480 x 272 resolution 262,144 colors
- Input: Keypad, four blue backlit buttons, Power/Hold switch
- Connectivity: USB 2.0
- Predecessor: ZEN Vision
- Related: Creative ZEN Portable media player

The ZEN Vision W is a portable media player, developed by Creative Technology, and was released in September 2006.

== Specifications ==
ZEN Vision W
Feature	Description
Display	4.3" LCD (24 bit - LED backlight)
Capacity	30 or 60 GB (1.8" HDD)
Dimensions	134mm x 75mm x 22mm (5.27in. x 2.95in x .85in)
Weight	276g (9.73 oz) - with battery
Battery Life	Audio playback > 13hrs Video playback > 4.5hrs
Video Playback Formats	AVI, WMV9, MPEG1, MPEG2, MPEG4-SP, MJPEG, DivX4.x/ 5.x, XviD-SP
Audio Playback Formats	MP3, WMA, WAV, Audible, Protected WMA
Image Formats Supported	JPEG
Battery	Removable and rechargeable Li-Ion battery (3.7 V - 1650 mAh)
Battery Life	Audio (13 hr) / Video (4.58 hr)
Signal-to-Noise Ratio	Up to 96 dB
THD	<0.1%
Frequency Response	20 Hz - 20 kHz
Audio Output	3.5mm stereo mini-jack, built-in speaker
Video Output	Composite TV-Out; supports NTSC and PAL systems
Interface	USB 2.0
Card Slot	Compact Flash Type I & II
PIM	Syncs with Microsoft Outlook Contacts, Calendar & Tasks
Components	TMS320DM320 (ARM926 CPU + C5409 DSP), TLV320AIC23B (Stereo CODEC), ISP1583 (USB Controller), PIC18LF4320, LTC3455 (USB Power Manager and Li-Ion Battery Charger)

== See also ==
- Creative ZEN
- Creative Technology
