= Creative MuVo =

Range of digital audio players produced by Creative Technology

The Creative MuVo (in some markets, formerly Creative NOMAD MuVo) is a range of digital audio players produced by Creative Technology Ltd.. More than a dozen models were produced.

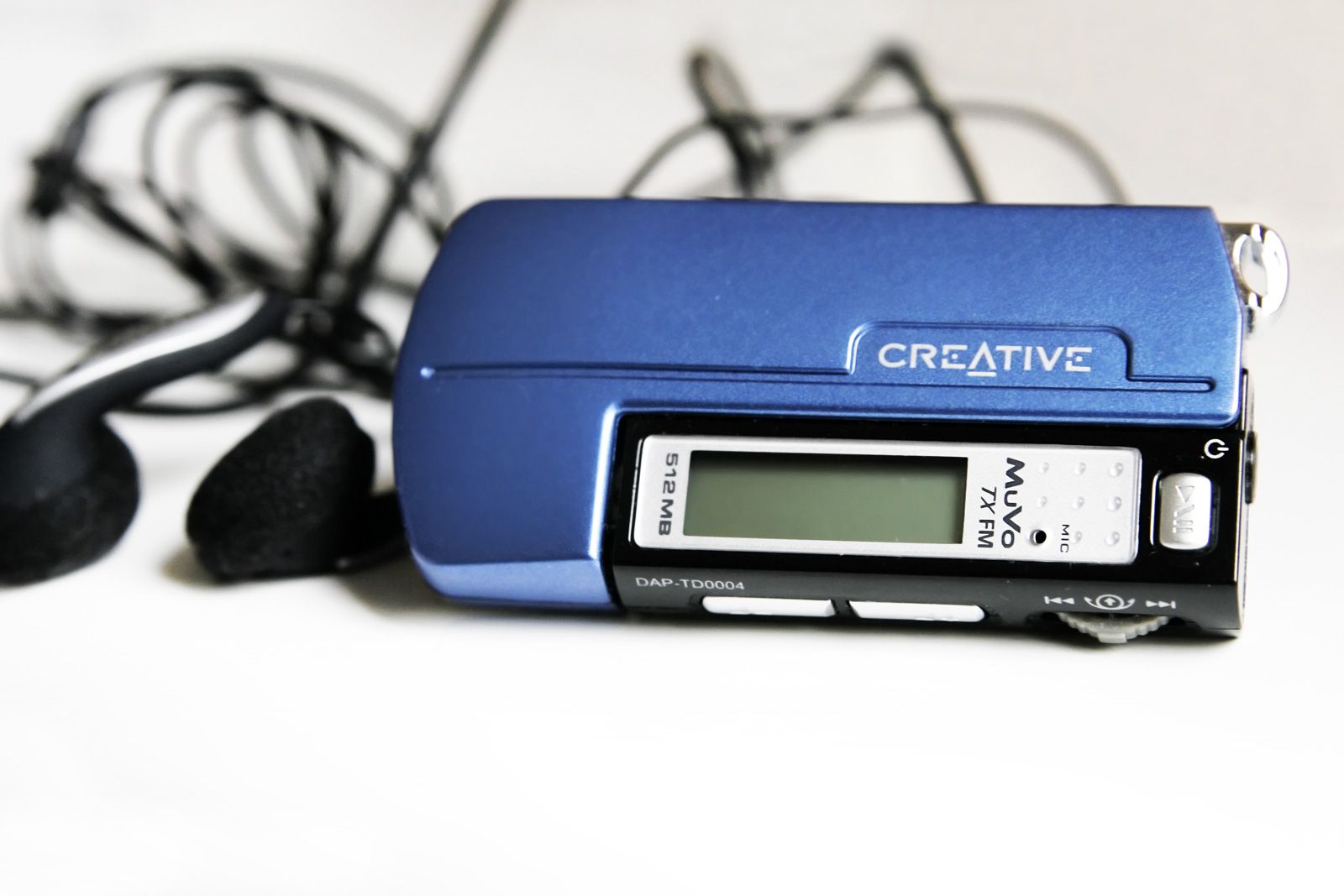
MuVo TX FM 512 MB

== See also ==
- Creative Technology Limited
- Creative NOMAD
- Creative ZEN
