= Line-in recording =

Audio recording from a line-level input

Line-in recording is a term often used by manufacturers of sound equipment to refer to the capability of a device to record line level audio feeds. Microphone and instrument inputs, by contrast, are designed for devices which require further amplification to be at line-level.

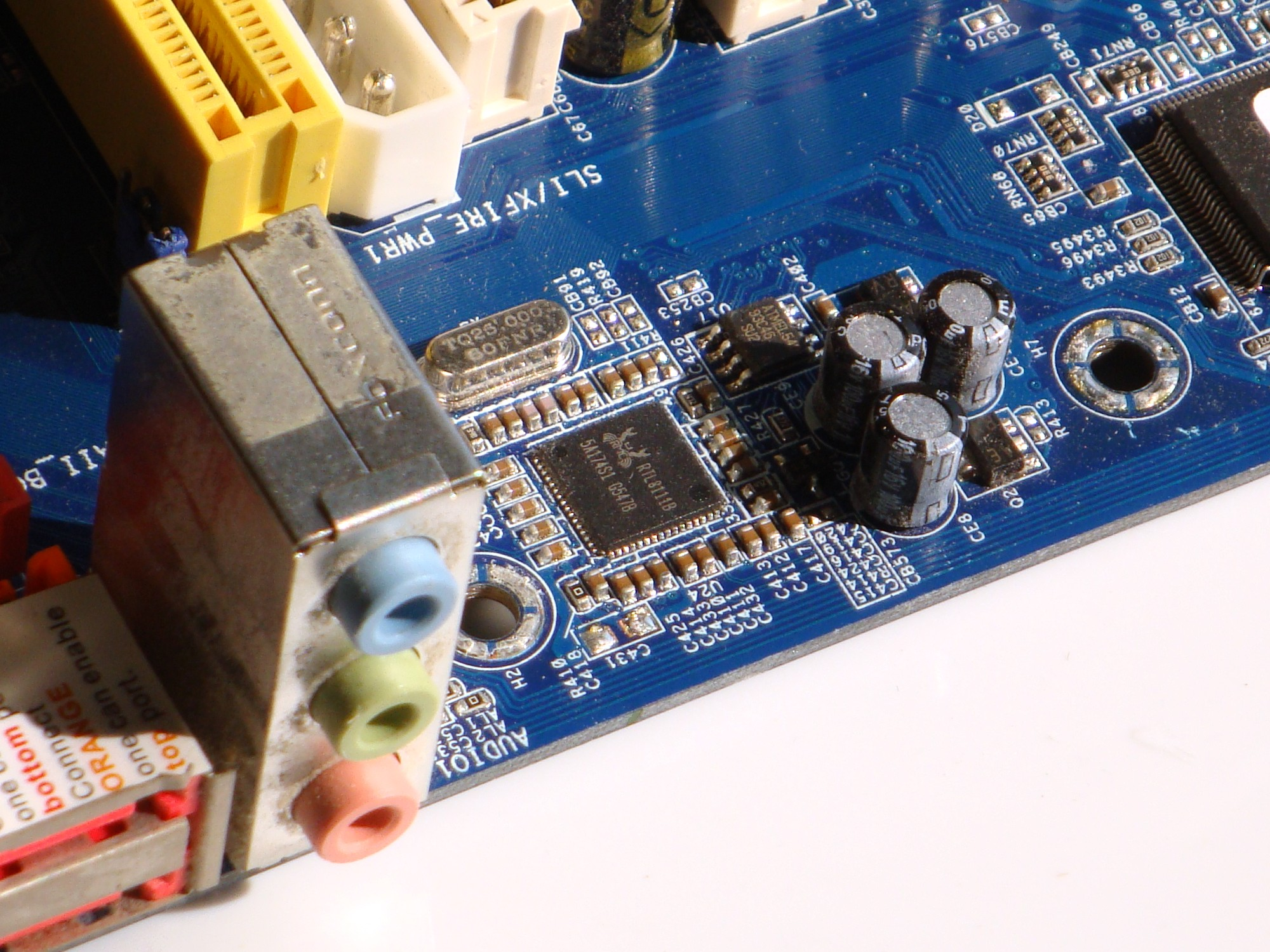
Line In Port (Blue) in backside of Motherboard

The common 3.5 mm line-in connector has the left channel on the tip and right channel in the middle. The port is used to connect with other devices. Line-in is most commonly used for instruments.
