= Creative Zen =

Line of portable media players by Creative Technology (2004–2011)

Creative ZEN
- Manufacturer: Creative Technology
- Type: Digital audio players, Portable media players
- Lifespan: 2004—2014
- Units sold: 25 million (as of 2007, includes NOMAD and MuVo)
- Predecessor: Creative NOMAD

ZEN is a series of portable media players designed and manufactured by Creative Technology Limited from 2004 to 2011. The players evolved from the NOMAD brand through the NOMAD Jukebox series of music players, with the first separate "ZEN" branded models released in 2004. The last Creative Zen player, X-Fi3, was released at the end of 2011.

Three Creative Zens (the Portable Media Center, Micro Photo, and Vision:M) won the Best of CES award from 2004 to 2006 in their respective categories, with the latter winning the overall award. The ZEN series had a strong foothold in Asian Pacific markets, especially in Singapore, the location of the company's headquarters.

All players support MP3 and WMA formats, with some models also supporting WAV and Audible formats. They are bundled with device drivers and Creative MediaSource, a media player that includes transferring and syncing abilities exclusively for the players. Some models are PlaysForSure-certified for being compatible with Windows Media Player via Media Transfer Protocol (MTP) and supporting the Janus DRM. They are natively compatible with Windows, with some also supporting Mac OS X.

== Models ==
=== NOMAD Jukebox Zen series ===
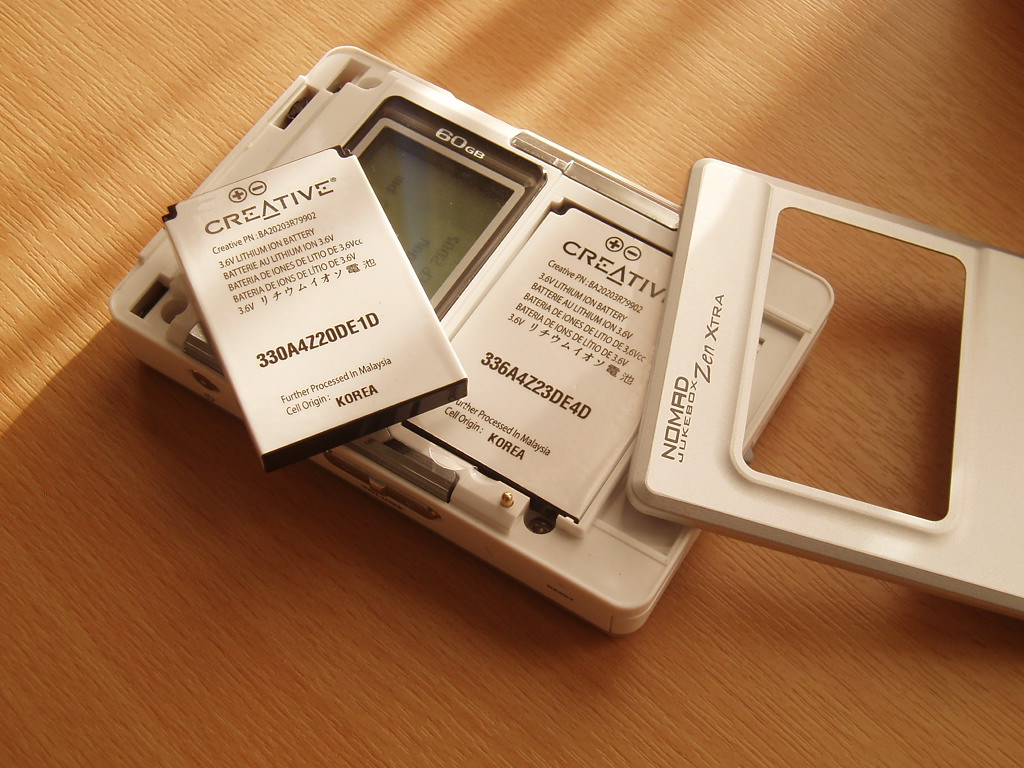
NOMAD Jukebox Zen players feature easily replaceable batteries

The first models branded as a "Zen" were released under the NOMAD line, and had an anodized aluminium case. The 2.5-inch Fujitsu hard drives ranged from a 20 (NOMAD Jukebox Zen), 30 (Zen NX, Zen Xtra), 40 and 60 GB (Xtra). Unlike the earlier NOMAD Jukebox players, which looked like CD players, these had the appearance of a cassette player.

==== NOMAD Jukebox Zen ====
Announced on October 14, 2002, the NOMAD Jukebox Zen was the first player to include the "Zen" branding. It had the distinct ability to connect via USB 1.1 or FireWire, while subsequent releases had connectivity to USB 2.0. Up to 14 hours of continuous audio playback is achieved by the rechargeable battery, and an optional wired remote gives the player an FM tuner and microphone.

==== NOMAD Jukebox Zen NX ====
The Zen NX, as it was later called, was released on August 20, 2003, as an upgrade to the NOMAD Jukebox Zen, with a removable battery and a slightly smaller size. Included with the player was MediaSource, the music management software that would be used with subsequent Zen players.

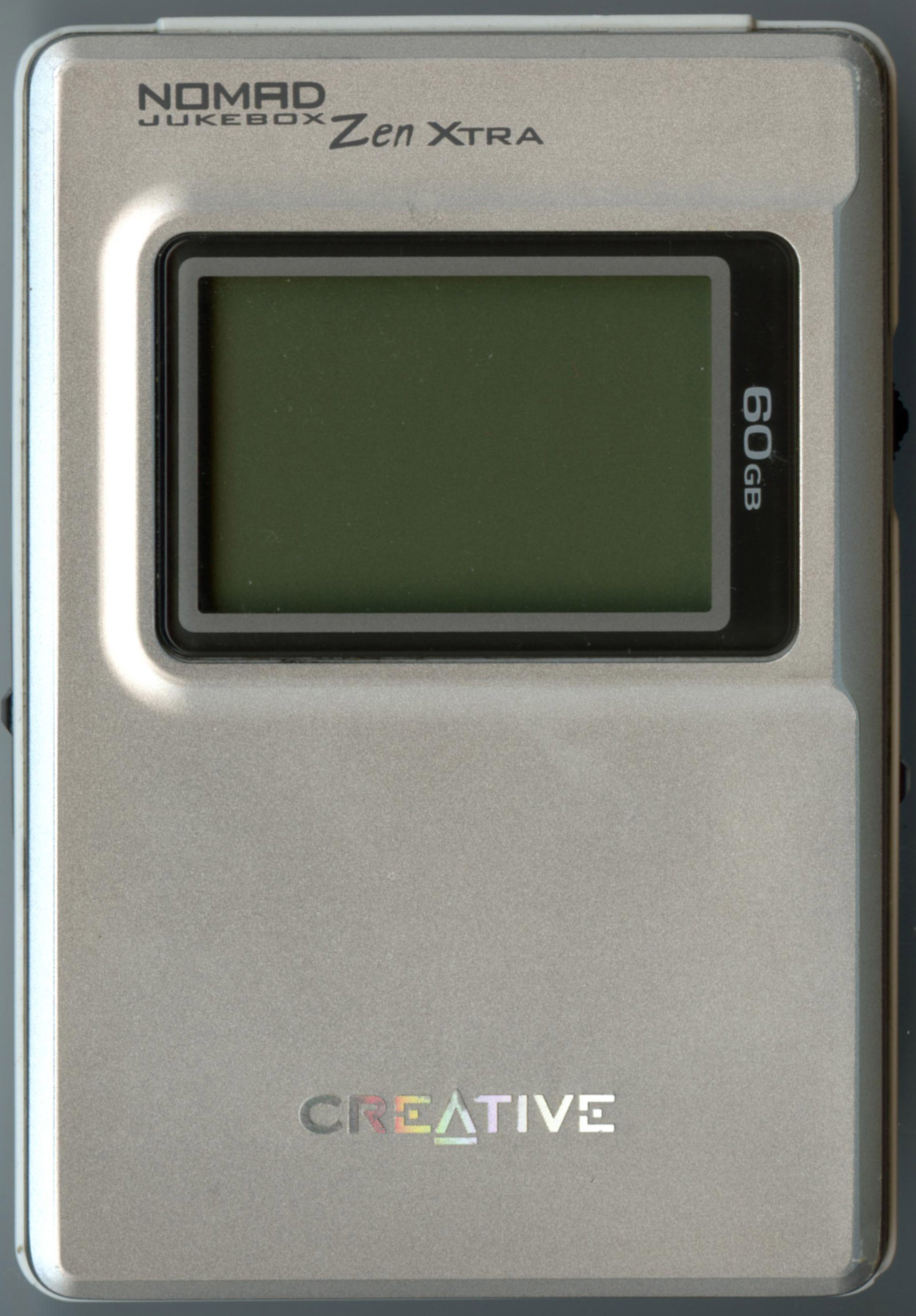
NOMAD Jukebox Zen Xtra

==== NOMAD Jukebox Zen Xtra ====
The NOMAD Jukebox Zen Xtra, or the Zen Xtra (renamed by Creative for commercial reasons) was released simultaneously with the Zen NX. The box included the player, a leather case with belt-clip, a lithium-ion battery, a USB cable, and a pair of standard earbuds. The Zen Xtra had a larger screen, but did not support the FM tuner from the original Zen and did not have recording capability.

The Xtra was the first DAP to support RealNetworks's Helix DRM, through tailored firmware. The SanDisk Sansa e200R would become the only other player to have this feature.

=== ZEN Portable Media Center ===
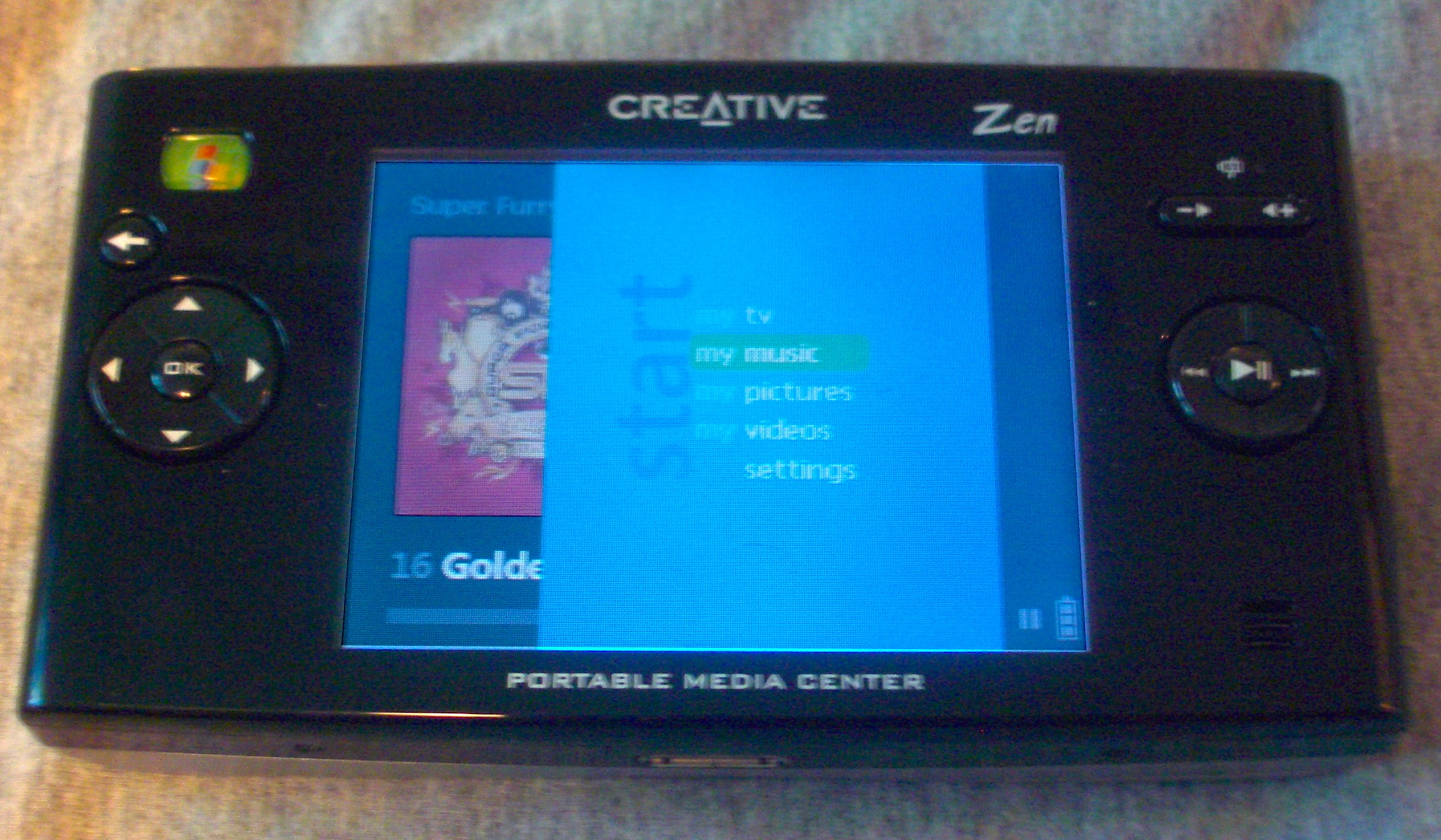
Zen Portable Media Center

The Zen Portable Media Center, announced on January 8, 2004, and released eight months later, is based on Microsoft's Portable Media Center interface, runs Windows Mobile and supports WMV, WMA, and MP3, and can display JPEG images; other video formats are supported through transcoding. This device was the first to exclusively support Microsoft's Media Transfer Protocol, and was presented at the Consumer Electronics Show in 2004, winning the TechTV Best of CES Award in the Portable Audio and Video category. The player uses a 1.8-inch 20 or 40 GB hard drive from Hitachi. The Zen Portable Media Center was replaced by the ZEN Vision and the ZEN Vision W.

=== ZEN Touch ===
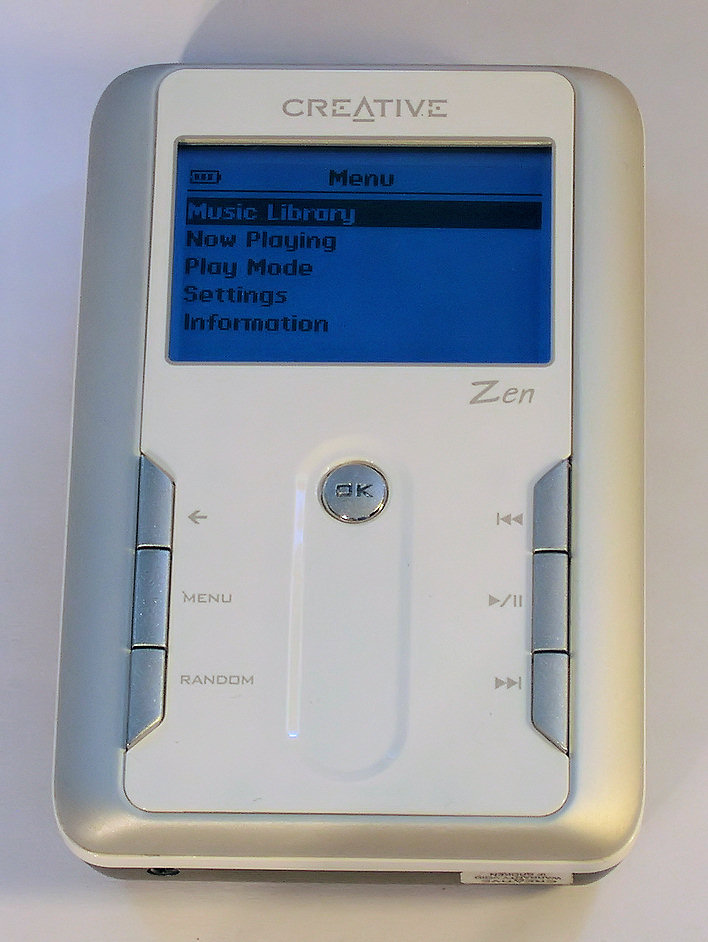
Creative ZEN Touch

The redesigned 40 GB Zen Touch was released on June 7, 2004. The model incorporated major changes in design, functionality and technology.

The Zen Touch has a smaller form factor and larger backlit blue display in a curved case. In addition, the device uses a touch-sensitive vertical strip on the front of the unit for easier file navigation. It used Hitachi's 1.8-inch hard drives in capacities of 20 and 40 GB. The Zen Touch has a stated batter life of around 24 hours, and although the battery was not supposed to be removable by the user, it is still user-replaceable because the case is closed with screws only and the battery attaches with a connector.

The Zen Touch has a brief uncredited appearance in Diet Pepsi's commercial which aired during Super Bowl XL featuring P. Diddy.

=== ZEN Micro ===
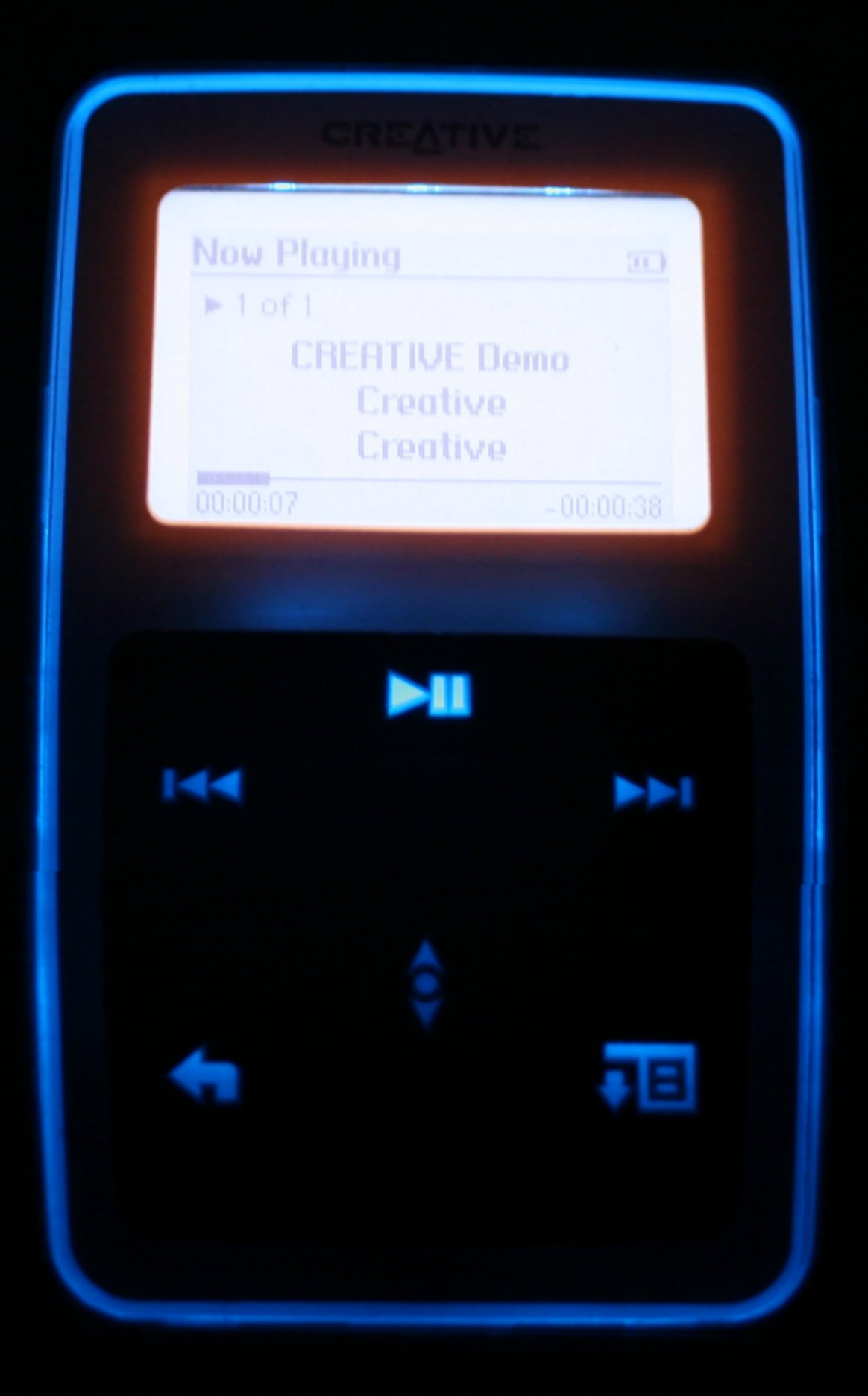
ZEN Micro glowing in the dark

The ZEN Micro was released on November 12, 2004, and is a microdrive player available in 10 colors. It is also the first ZEN release that sports the new branding, including capitals for all letters in Zen.

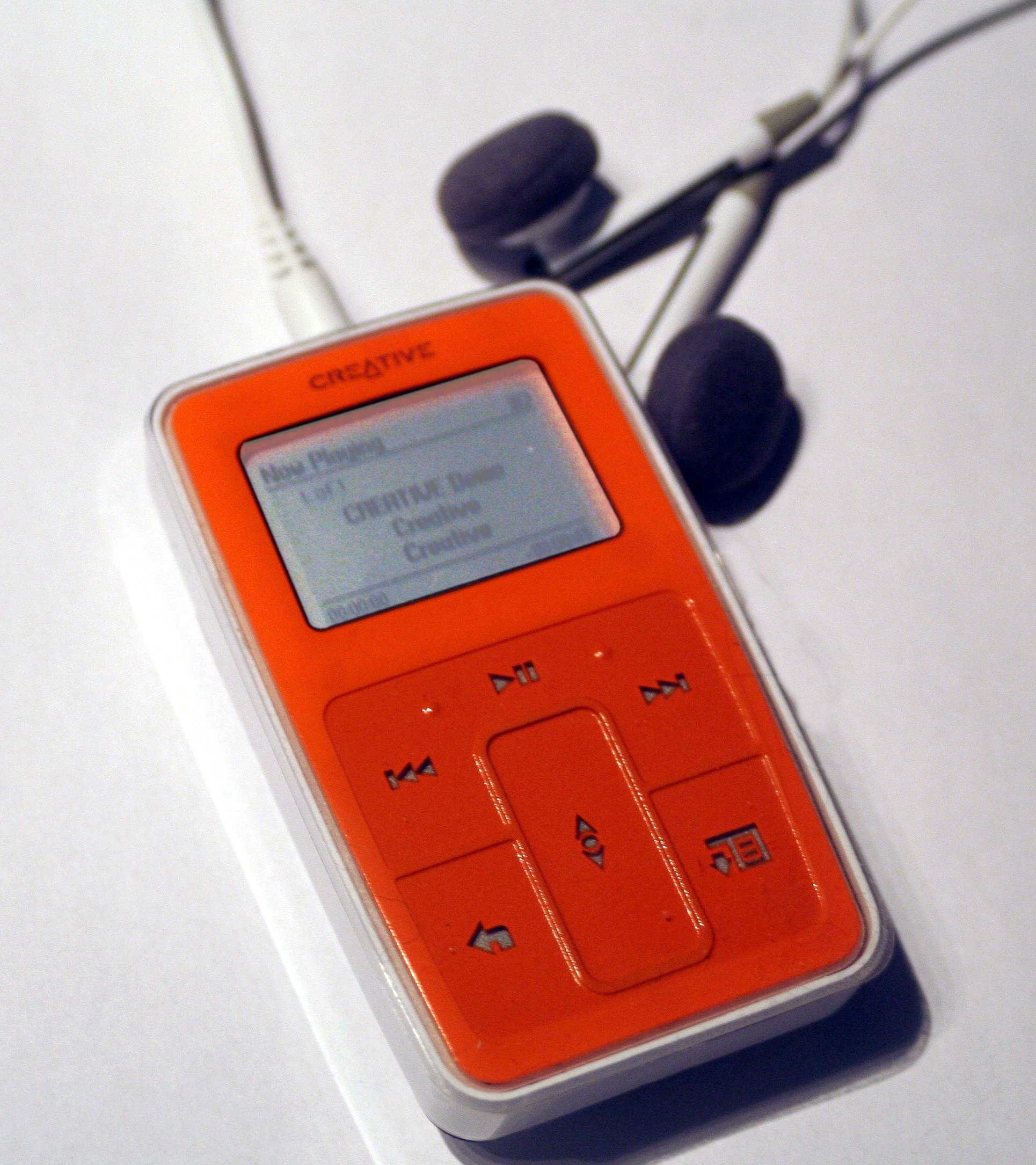
ZEN Micro with the included earphones

The ZEN Micro is much smaller than the Touch and shares a similar interface and controls (including the touchpad, without the 'OK' button. Making a selection would be done by tapping the touchpad). The Micro has a removable battery rated to last for up to 12 hours of continuous playback. In addition, the player has an LED-backlit LCD, a glowing case, and offers hard disk capacities of 4, 5 and 6 GB.

The Micro also features a built-in FM tuner/recorder, voice recorder and microphone, partitioning for data storage (i.e. acting as a removable hard drive for PCs), and the ability to synchronize contacts, tasks and calendars with Microsoft Outlook. Accessories for the ZEN Micro include matching color speakers, wireless headsets and a wired remote control.

The first 35,000 units shipped worldwide were packaged as a "Limited Edition" package that came with an additional rechargeable battery. Asian models of the Limited Edition included the extra battery and a wired remote control.

At CES 2005, it was announced that the ZEN Micro line would be expanded to include 4 and 6 GB models.

The ZEN Micro optionally supports the Microsoft Media Transfer Protocol and the PlaysForSure certification with updated firmware.

The Micro competed with players such as iPod Mini and Rio Carbon.

=== ZEN (Micro-based hard drive player) ===
The ZEN was released on April 6, 2005, and is slightly larger than the ZEN Micro with a 20 GB hard drive capacity. The ZEN, however, has a magnesium back-casing and the battery is unremovable. This model was initially available in the Asia-Pacific region, but soon became available in the US through Cambridge SoundWorks, a subsidiary of Creative.

=== ZEN Neeon ===
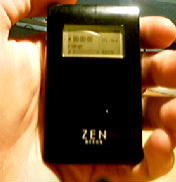
ZEN Neeon

The ZEN Neeon was released on May 17, 2005. It is a throwback to the old Zen Xtra, but in a much smaller size. The 5 GB model has an SNR of 98 dB and a battery life of 16 hours (19 hours with new firmware version). The front has a piano black finish, and the back is anodized aluminium that comes in ten colors. and the LCD screen has a 7 color backlight.

The Creative ZEN Neeon was criticized highly at the time of release for having a slow interface, more specifically slow start-up, menus and song switch. As well, the first released models came with a Windows virus. A later firmware update provided a much quicker start-up time and interface.

Like the Zen Micro, this unit has an FM tuner and a microphone, but also has a line in record function. This model does not use proprietary USB drivers; it is a standard USB mass storage device.

On November 17, 2005, the microdrive player was updated to 6 GB and a new flash range was launched in capacities of 512 MB, 1 GB, and 2 GB. The revised device is equipped with a dual-tone OLED screen. The device is also accompanied by a new marketing campaign, Put a Face to Your Music, with emphasis on a whole new range of customizable "Stik-Ons", which are decal stickers that can be placed and removed from the face of the unit.

=== ZEN MicroPhoto ===
The ZEN MicroPhoto, released on July 28, 2005, shares the same features of the ZEN Micro except Audible.com support (reinstated in firmware versions 1.31.01 and above), and adds an upgraded 262,144-color (18 bpp) OLED screen for displaying photos. To fix the lack of bass with the ZEN Micro, Creative implemented a Bass Boost feature, available in most subsequent players. The 8 GB player is available in the same colors of the Micro and is advertised to store "thousands of JPEGs" or "4,000 songs". Due to its larger battery, the player can play up to 15 hours of continuous playback, 3 hours longer than its predecessor. The MicroPhoto is the first of many subsequent players with expanded customization, with the ability to use a picture as a custom wallpaper, with color themes to change the tones of it, and six color schemes.

The player was first announced at the 2005 Consumer Electronics Show, where it won the G4TV Best of CES award in the Audio To Go category. In November 2005, the player was the CNET Editor's Choice award on CNET.com.

=== ZEN Sleek/Sleek Photo ===
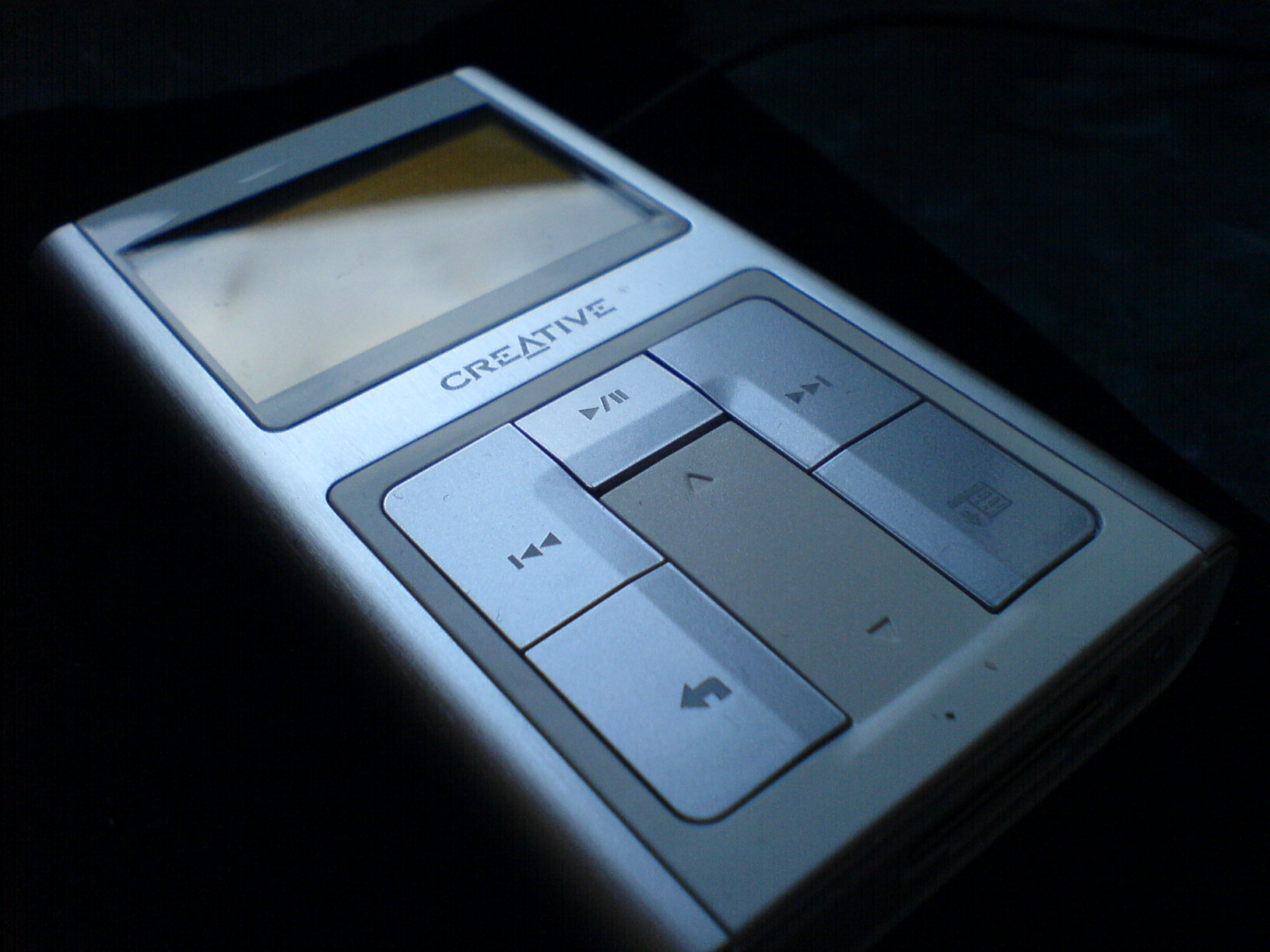
ZEN Sleek

The ZEN Sleek was first available on August 30, 2005, and is an upgrade of the ZEN with a 20 GB hard drive, FM radio, built-in microphone, and sports an aluminium casing. Like its predecessors, it can synchronize with Microsoft Outlook's calendar, address book, and memo functions. The player has a battery life of up to 20 hours.

The ZEN Sleek Photo was released on October 6, 2005. It is the color-screen equivalent of the Sleek, with the extra ability to view JPEG photos on an OLED screen.

=== ZEN Vision ===
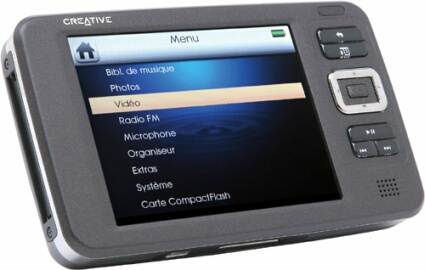
ZEN Vision (Black)

The ZEN Vision was released on October 1, 2005. Since its launch, it is the winner of several awards, including Best of Digital Life 2005 and the Red dot design award. Unlike its predecessor, the ZEN Vision does not have Microsoft's Portable Media Center interface. It supports audio (WMA-DRM, WMA, MP3, WAV), video (WMV, Motion JPEG, MPEG 1/2/4, DivX 4/5, xvid) and picture (JPEG) playback. The ZEN Vision utilizes a 30 GB 1.8-inch Toshiba hard drive and can partition a part of its hard drive to work as a removable disk (up to 16 GB) for any operating system. There are some features of the ZEN Vision which require compatibility with certain operating systems, e.g. require users to have access to Microsoft Windows XP (SP1 or higher).

Like past models, the ZEN Vision comes with an FM tuner, a voice and FM recorder, and a calendar and organizer that can be synchronized with Microsoft Outlook.

The ZEN Vision has a 3.7-inch, trans-reflective VGA TFT-LCD screen. It has a video output (PAL or NTSC) port and a CompactFlash slot which can be used to transfer the contents to the player. An adapter for other memory card types is also available as an accessory. The ZEN Vision also supports an optional infrared remote.

=== ZEN Vision:M ===
The ZEN Vision:M, launched on December 8, 2005, is adapted from the earlier released Vision. The 2.5-inch, TFT LCD display has a resolution of 320 by 240 pixels (QVGA), and is capable of outputting 640 x 480 using a composite video cable. The player has an estimated battery life of 16 hours for audio, and five hours for videos (tested under continuous playback). Album art is shown during playback, and image-viewing is enhanced with pan, zoom and rotation abilities. The 30 GB model is available in white, black, green, blue and pink. Like the other players in the Vision and Micro lines, this model is known for its glowing button symbols.

The ZEN Vision:M has won a number of accolades, including the "Best of Show" and "Best Portable Audio & Video Device" awards at the 2006 Consumer Electronics Show, as well as the Red Dot Design Award.

On August 31, 2006, Creative announced the availability of an upgraded player with 60 GB capacity. This version has a USB host adapter cable, which enables users to transfer photos from a digital camera directly to the player. It is only available in black and white, and was initially slightly thicker than the 30 GB model. On March 11, 2007, the 60 GB model was upgraded with a new slimmer profile - the same thickness as the 30 GB version.

=== ZEN Nano/ZEN Nano Plus ===
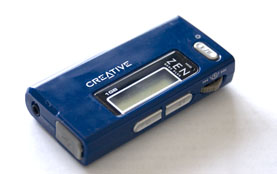
ZEN Nano Plus (1 GB Blue)

The ZEN Nano and the ZEN Nano Plus were released internationally on June 1, 2006. The player is a rebranded MuVo N200. The ZEN Nano Plus is a USB mass storage device, and does not require proprietary drivers. It has a battery-life of up to 18 hours using an AAA battery. Like the Micro and the MicroPhoto, the Nano is available in ten colors: black, pink, red, orange, green, light blue, blue, purple, gray, and white.

The ZEN Nano Plus is a Nano with an FM tuner with 30 custom presets, plus voice, radio, and line-in recording. Recorded audio is encoded in WAV (ADPCM), except for line-in, which encodes to MP3.

=== ZEN Neeon 2 ===
The ZEN Neeon 2, a successor to the Neeon, was announced on August 2, 2006. The player has a 1.5-inch CSTN-LCD in a resolution of 128×128. The 1 and 2 GB models are available in a black, silver, blue, pink or orange backplate, accompanied with a piano black front, while the 4 GB model comes only in black and silver. The Neeon 2 supports MP3, WMA, and WAV, display JPEG images and plays AVI videos which are transcoded upon transfer. Also, the player has an FM tuner, built-in microphone, and line-in recording in WMA. The rechargeable lithium-ion battery plays up to 20 hours of continuous audio playback and up to 8 hours of video playback, the highest for any Creative digital audio player.

Like its predecessor, decal stickers called "Stik-Ons" are sold separately to customize the look of the Neeon 2's frontplate, though they cannot be interchanged. The players and their "Stik-Ons" are only available in Australia, Singapore and several other Asian countries.

=== ZEN Vision W ===
The ZEN Vision W was released on September 17, 2006. A variant of the ZEN Vision, the portable media player has a 4.3-inch, widescreen (16:9) TFT-LCD. The player comes in black and is available with 30 or 60 GB capacity. Like the ZEN Vision:M, a built-in microphone and an FM tuner are included, as well as support for the same media formats, a similar graphical interface and the ability to sync organizer data from Microsoft Outlook. It also includes a CompactFlash reader for extra capacity and the direct upload of images.

=== ZEN Stone/Stone Plus ===
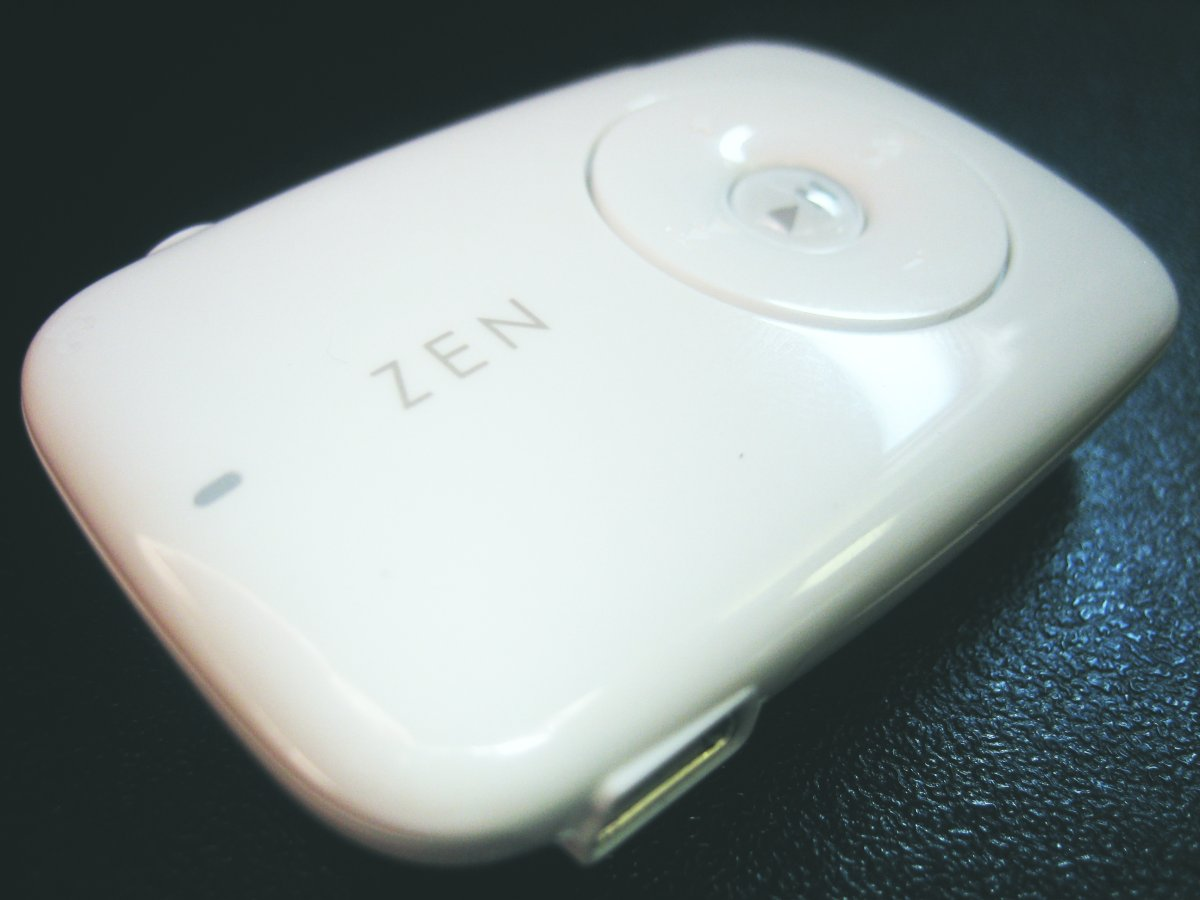
ZEN Stone (White)

The ZEN Stone, released on May 3, 2007, is a small and screenless 1 or 2 GB player. Coated in glossy plastic, the player is available in black, white, blue, pink, green, and red. The ZEN Stone is compatible with the MP3, WMA, and Audible formats, is UMS compliant, and the battery lasts up to 11 hours.

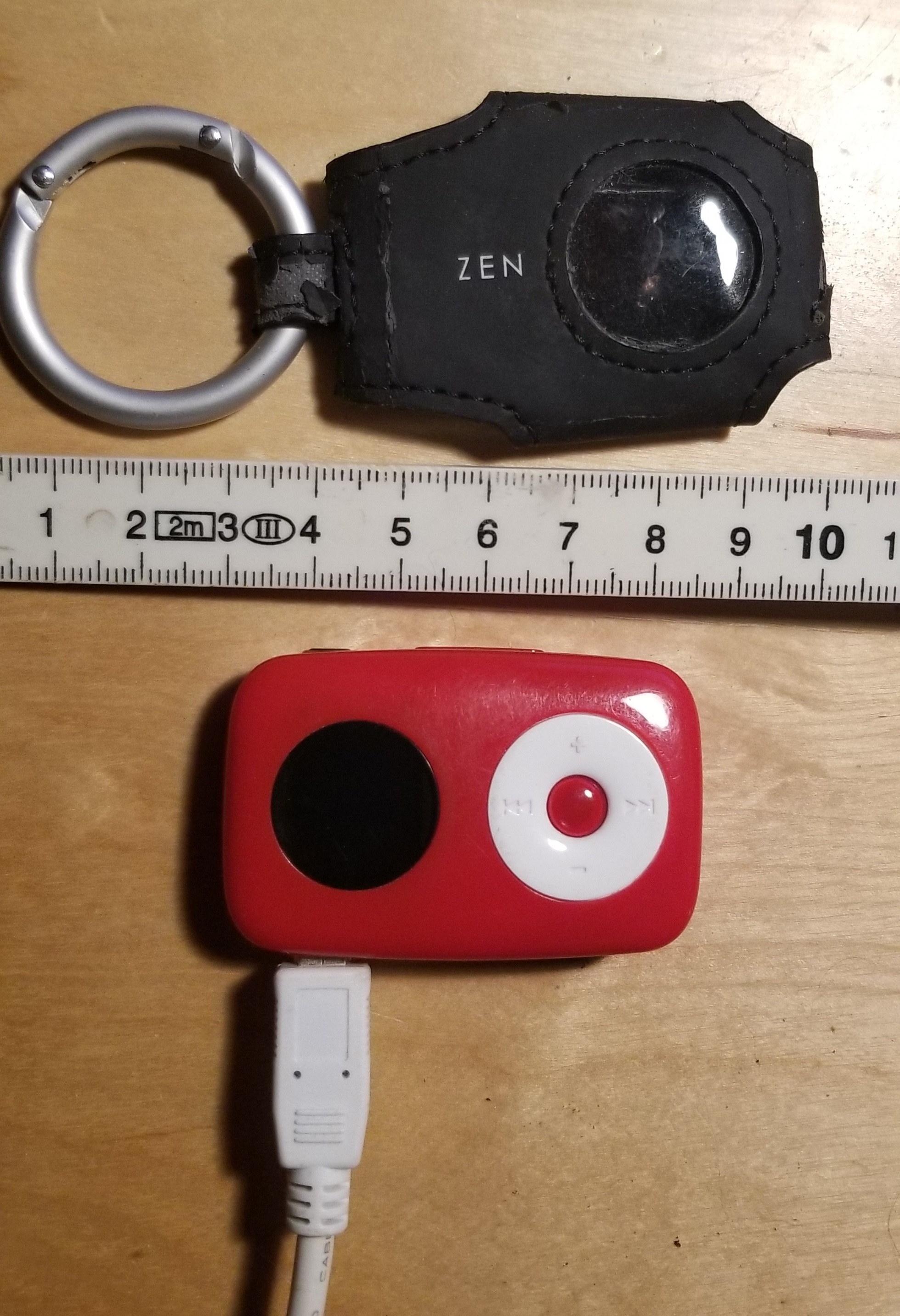
ZEN Stone Plus with case

Although it is slightly larger than the ZEN Stone, the ZEN Stone Plus is identical in design. However, the ZEN Stone Plus has a monochromic OLED screen, a built-in FM tuner, a stopwatch (the first ZEN player to have this ability) and a built-in microphone. The ZEN Stone Plus plays approximately 9.5 hours of continuous audio playback, and comes with the same colors as the ZEN Stone in a 2 GB capacity. A 4 GB model was subsequently released on June 29, 2007. A built-in speaker version was also released. Both versions support MP3 and WMA, with the built-in speaker version also supporting iTunes-encoded AAC and Audible formats.

A successor called the Zen Krystal was presented in 2008, featuring a pedometer.

=== ZEN Wav ===
The ZEN Wav was released on May 25, 2007. The flash-based player has built-in stereo speakers and supports the MP3, WMA, and WAV formats. It is the first player in the ZEN line to have the following features: a 16-bit color screen, unlike other ZEN players, which are 8-bit; a battery life of 30 hours (20 with the speakers), which was the longest compared to any previous ZEN player; the ability to read e-books; and the ability to show 3 different time zones "at a glance". The ZEN Wav comes in capacities of 2 and 4 GB.

=== ZEN V/ZEN V Plus ===
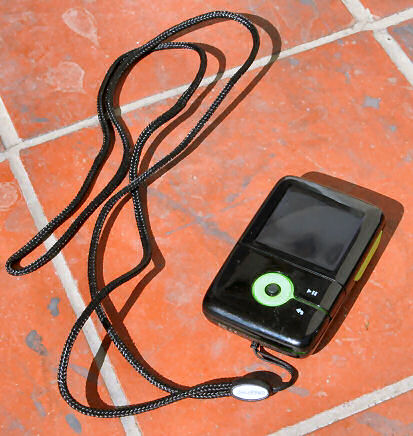
ZEN V (Green/Black, 2 GB)

Creative's first flash-based portable media player was released on June 20, 2006. The scratch-resistant models have an OLED display with a resolution of 128×128. They come in white and black with orange trim for the 1 GB version, green trim for 2 GB, and black with blue trim for the 4 GB version and later an 8 GB version. The ZEN V Plus plays video and has an FM tuner, while the ZEN V does not. The players support the same formats as the Vision:M, while the videos will be trans coded upon transfer. There are also built-in microphones for voice recording, as well as wires for line-in recording. The rechargeable lithium-ion battery has a life span of up to 15 hours of continuous audio playback.

The ZEN V Plus won the CNET Editor's Choice award during that month.

On September 29, 2006, Creative announced that the blue-and-black ZEN V Plus had been upgraded to 8 GB. Four days later, the company joined forces with the National Breast Cancer Foundation to release a pink version of the 2 GB model, available in most areas. In Europe and Japan, the 8 GB version is available in a red-and-black color.

On August 8, 2007, Creative released a 16 GB model of the ZEN V Plus, making it the highest capacity flash-based player until the ZEN beat its own record with the release of its 32 GB model.

=== ZEN ===
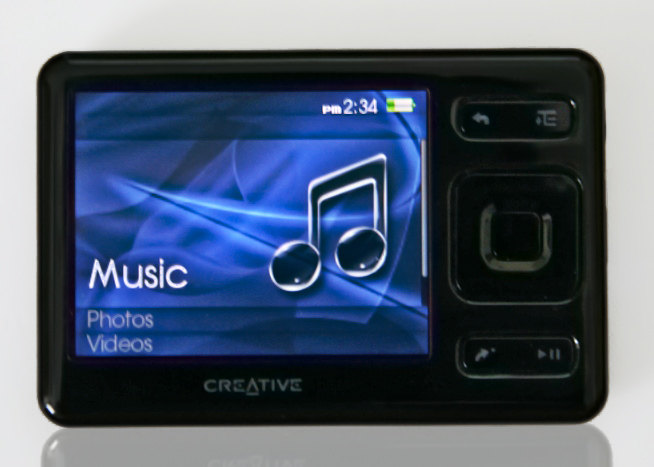
ZEN

The replacement of the ZEN:VisionM, simply called "ZEN", offered many of the same features but in a small pocket-sized form factor. This flash-based player was released on September 14, 2007, in capacities of 2, 4, 8, and 16 GB. A 32 GB model was announced on December 4, 2007, setting a record for storage capacity among flash-based players. The player is 0.44-inch thick, making it the slimmest ZEN player so far. It is the first ZEN to have an SD card slot, support for unprotected iTunes-encoded AAC, and a 24-bit color screen.

=== ZEN MX ===
The ZEN MX is a derivative of the ZEN, released in 2009. It shares the same form factor as the ZEN, but reduced processing power, cosmetic changes and changes in firmware resulted in a slightly stripped-down and sluggishly operating player, retailing as a lower price.

=== ZEN X-Fi ===
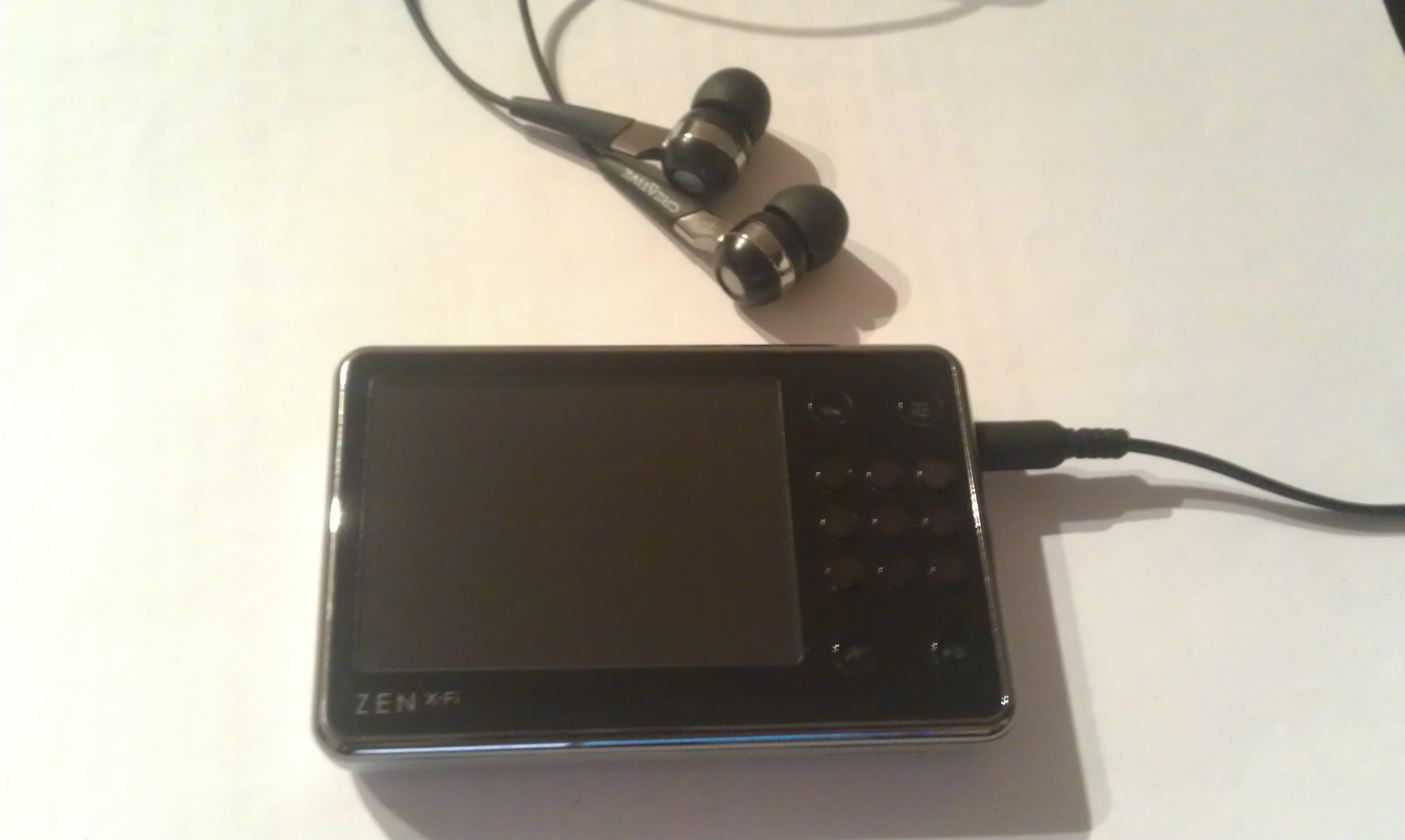
Zen X-Fi

The ZEN X-Fi was officially confirmed on July 10, 2008. The player's design is based on the ZEN and includes new features such as X-Fi technology, Wi-Fi, and online chat. The package includes a set of EP-830 headphones, and a built in speaker. It also supports wireless media streaming from a home network, similar to a Windows Media Center Extender. The player sold in capacities of 8 GB (without Wi-Fi), 16 GB, and 32 GB.

=== ZEN Mozaic ===
The ZEN Mozaic is a flash player that was released on August 3, 2008, in capacities of 2, 4, 8, and 16 GB. The Mozaic features a 1.8-inch video screen, a keypad that resembles a mosaic pattern, and a built-in speaker (also in a mosaic pattern). It also includes features such as a built-in FM radio, voice recorder, and picture viewer. The ZEN Mozaic has two derivatives, the ZEN Mozaic LX and the ZEN Mozaic EZ300. The ZEN Mozaic LX is a more affordable model which lacks an FM Radio and built-in speakers. The ZEN Mozaic EZ300 is nearly identical in terms of function to the original Mozaic, but supports plug and play and only comes in solid colors (black, silver or pink).

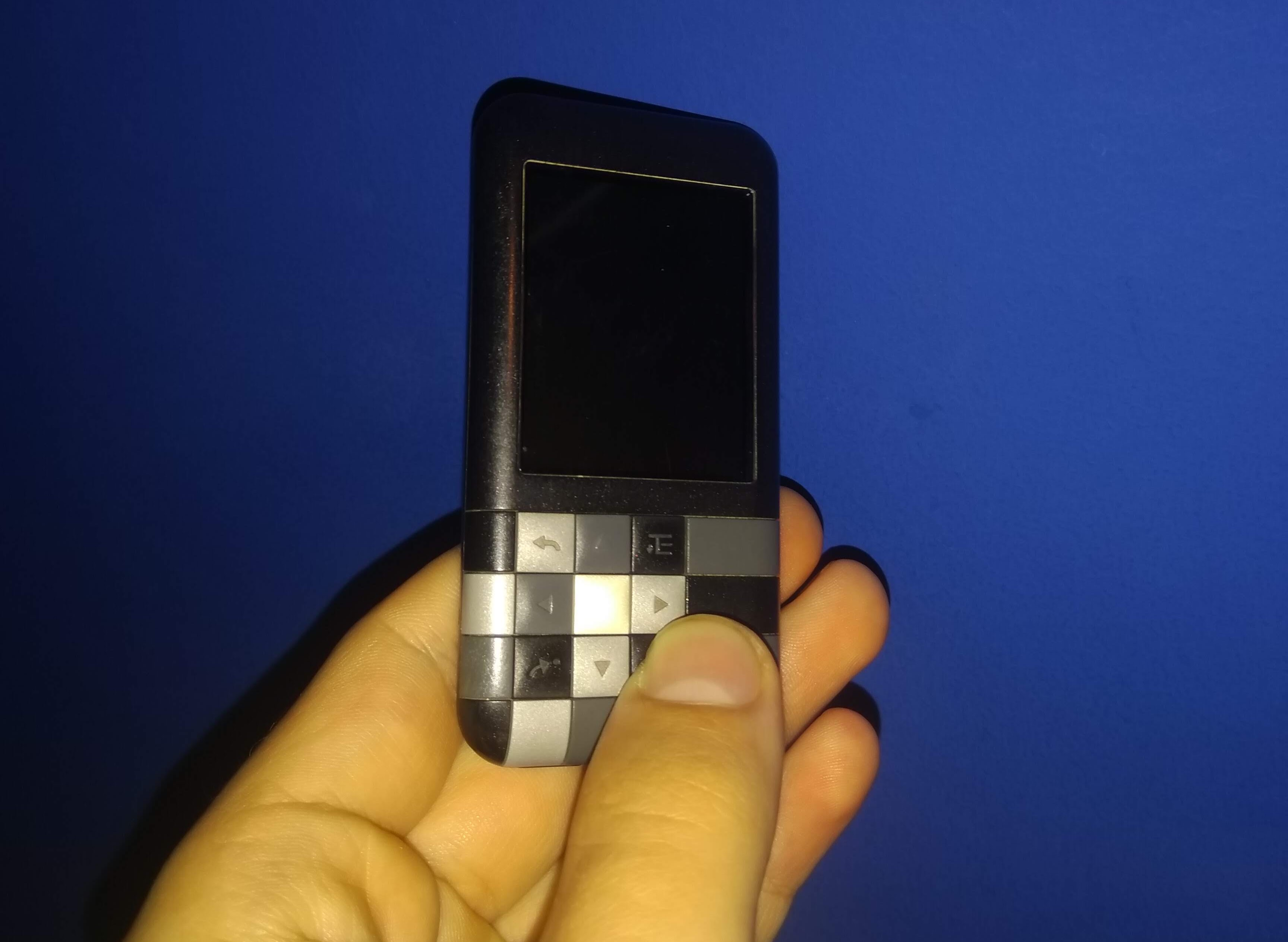
Zen Mosaic

=== ZEN X-Fi2 ===
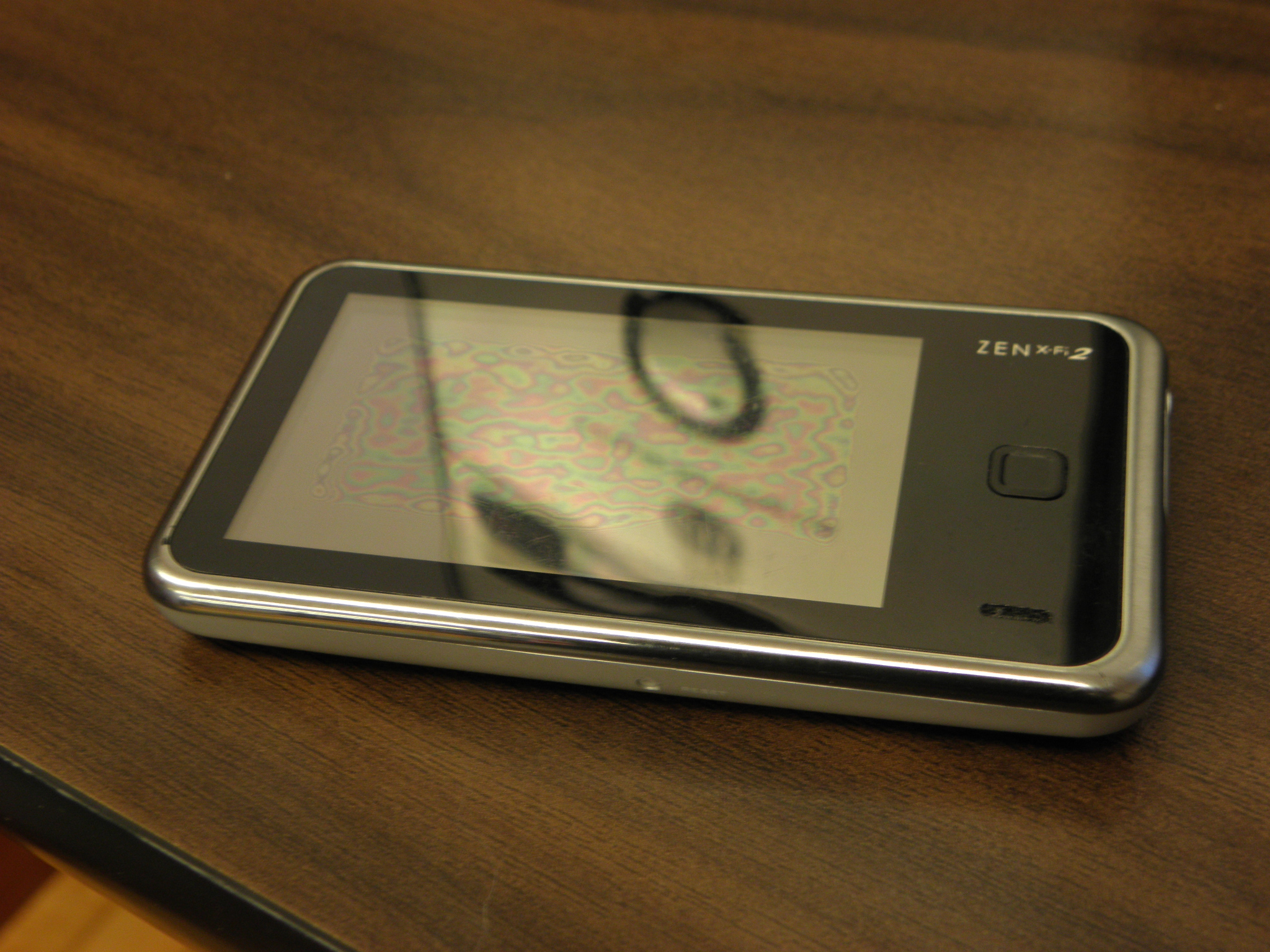
Zen X-Fi 2

The ZEN X-Fi2, announced September 2, 2009 is a feature update to the X-Fi. It includes many features of the X-Fi, including flash memory, X-Fi audio enhancements, and expandable memory. However, there are several notable differences between the two. The X-Fi2 features a full touchscreen user input mode, unlike the original's keypad-esque input method. Also, the X-Fi2 no longer has wireless networking features, and trades the SD input for a microSD card slot. Added to the player is support for the lossless, open-source FLAC codec, A/V output to a TV, and offline RSS reader support. Compared to similarly featured models from competitors, it is lower priced as well. It comes in 8 GB, 16 GB, 32 GB and 64 GB variations. As with most other models, the Zen X-Fi2 charges via USB port, but can also be charged using a separately available wall adapter. An Application Development Kit based on the Lua programming language is offered for homebrew applications and games.

=== ZEN X-Fi Style ===
The release of the ZEN X-Fi Style series was announced on April 8, 2010. It was created as a more affordable version of the X-Fi2, with removed Wi-Fi capability and touchscreen. The X-Fi Style comes in capacities of 8, 16, and 32 GB. The player features a 2.4-inch display, video out, X-Fi technology, a built-in speaker, FM radio, alarm clock, calendar and voice recorder. The battery life is rated at 25 hours for music and 5 hours for video. However, the expansion slot is omitted.

=== ZEN Style 100/300 ===
The ZEN Style series was announced at the same time as the X-Fi Style on April 9, 2010. The series is available in 4, 8, and 16 GB capacities. Both models have the same portrait design similar to Creative's ZEN Mozaic, as well as the same sized screen as the Mozaic, at 1.8-inches. The series features an alarm, calendar, voice recorder, and video and photo support. The Zen Style 300 also includes a built-in speaker and FM radio. The battery life is rated at 32 hours for music and 4 hours for video. The Zen Style was not compatible with the then-popular Napster-To-Go feature.

=== ZEN Touch 2 ===
The first ZEN with Android 2.1 on board. (Upgradeable to 2.2) Announced on November 2, 2010. Has a microSD card slot, Bluetooth, wifi, and is available in 8 GB with GPS, or 8 GB or 16 GB without GPS. The player comes bundled with the popular EP-630 in-ear earphones from Creative. A GPS version is also available in the 8 GB capacity.

A firmware to update the player to Android 2.2 was released by Creative on 26 April 2011. With the update, the ZEN Touch 2 supported Flash and also Audible content for certain regions.

=== ZEN Style M100/M300 ===
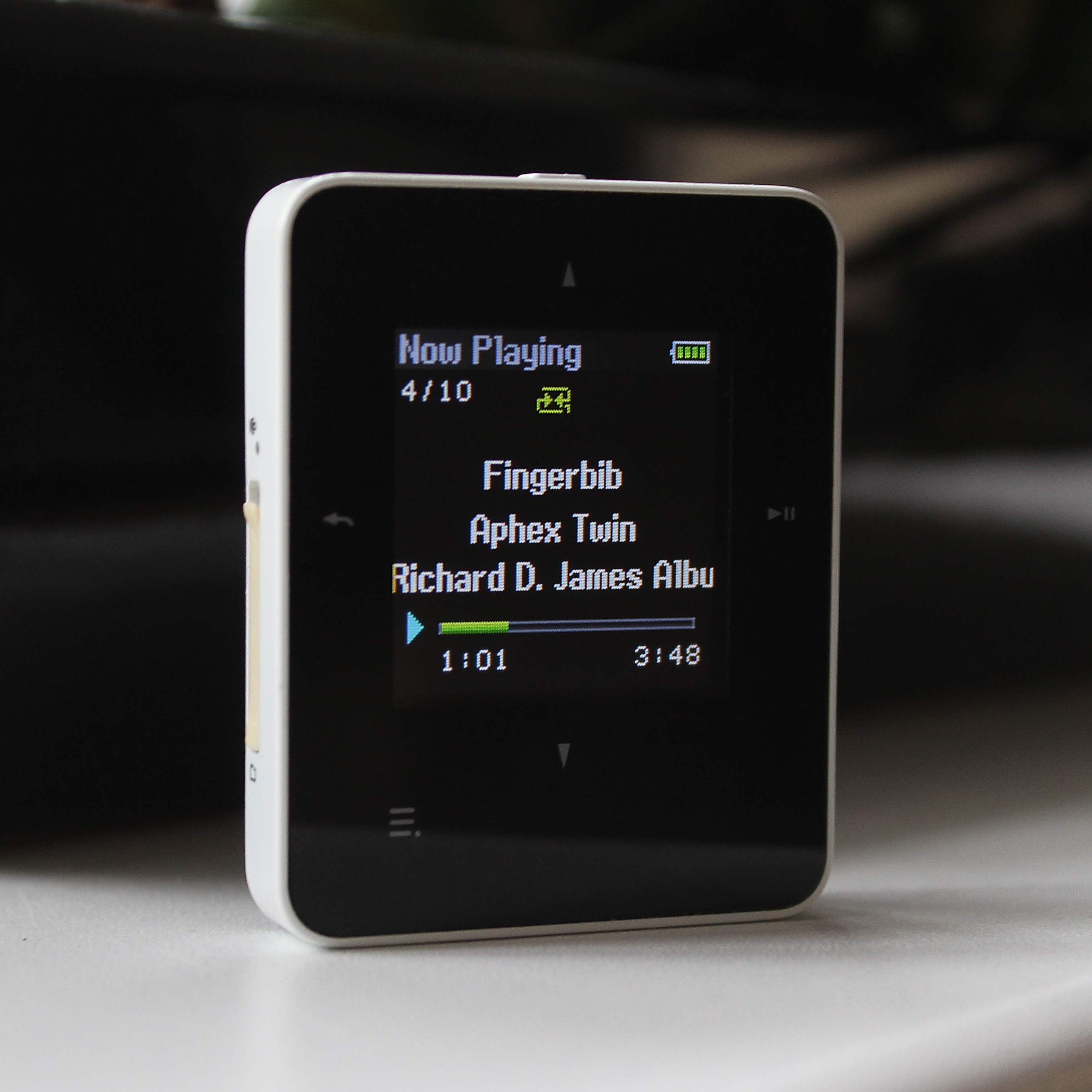
ZEN Style M100 (White)

The ZEN Style M300, announced on May 5, 2011, is a compact and lightweight Bluetooth MP3 player with a 1.4-inch screen and capacitive touch controls. Despite its small form size, the player has a full range of features including FM radio, photo and video playback, built-in microphone as well as a microSD slot to expand your music and photo library on the player. The player comes in 4 colors (Black, White, Yellow and Red) and 3 capacities (4, 8 and 16 GB). A non-Bluetooth/FM radio version - the ZEN Style M100 is also available. Creative released an updated firmware (1.00.16) on the 11th of August 2011 which fixes some of the freezing and Bluetooth issues the player had when it was launched with its initial firmware.

=== ZEN X-Fi3 ===
The ZEN X-Fi3 is Creative's 3rd MP3 player to feature its proprietary X-Fi audio technology. It includes X-Fi Crystallizer. Primary function of the Crystallizer is to "restore portions of the sound which were lost during compression". The available storage (8 GB or 16 GB) could be expanded thanks to the microSD card slot. The player was introduced at IFA 2011.

The "compression" that is meant here is not the digital file-size reduction achieved by digital audio data compression technologies like for example mp3. Rather, the idea is to reverse the effects of dynamic range compression. X-Fi Expand allows you to experience surround sound effect on your earphones.

The ZEN X-Fi3 features a 2-inch non-touch TFT display with touch buttons. It supports Bluetooth 2.1 and apt-X codec. Other features of the player include FM radio, photo and video playback, on-the-go playlist creation, built-in speaker and microphone and microSD slot (integrated).

== Hardware ==
Most models are built with Texas Instruments's TMS320DA25x ARM architecture and digital signal processor that makes up the CPU, while the operating system used is Texas Instruments DSP/BIOS. The peripheral circuits take care of all media decoding without any accelerator chips. The touchpads are managed by Synaptics controllers.

The newer ZEN players uses SigmaTel's STMP3700 ARM, described to be "designed specifically for portable devices". Nucleus RTOS makes up the base of their OSes.

== Marketing campaign ==
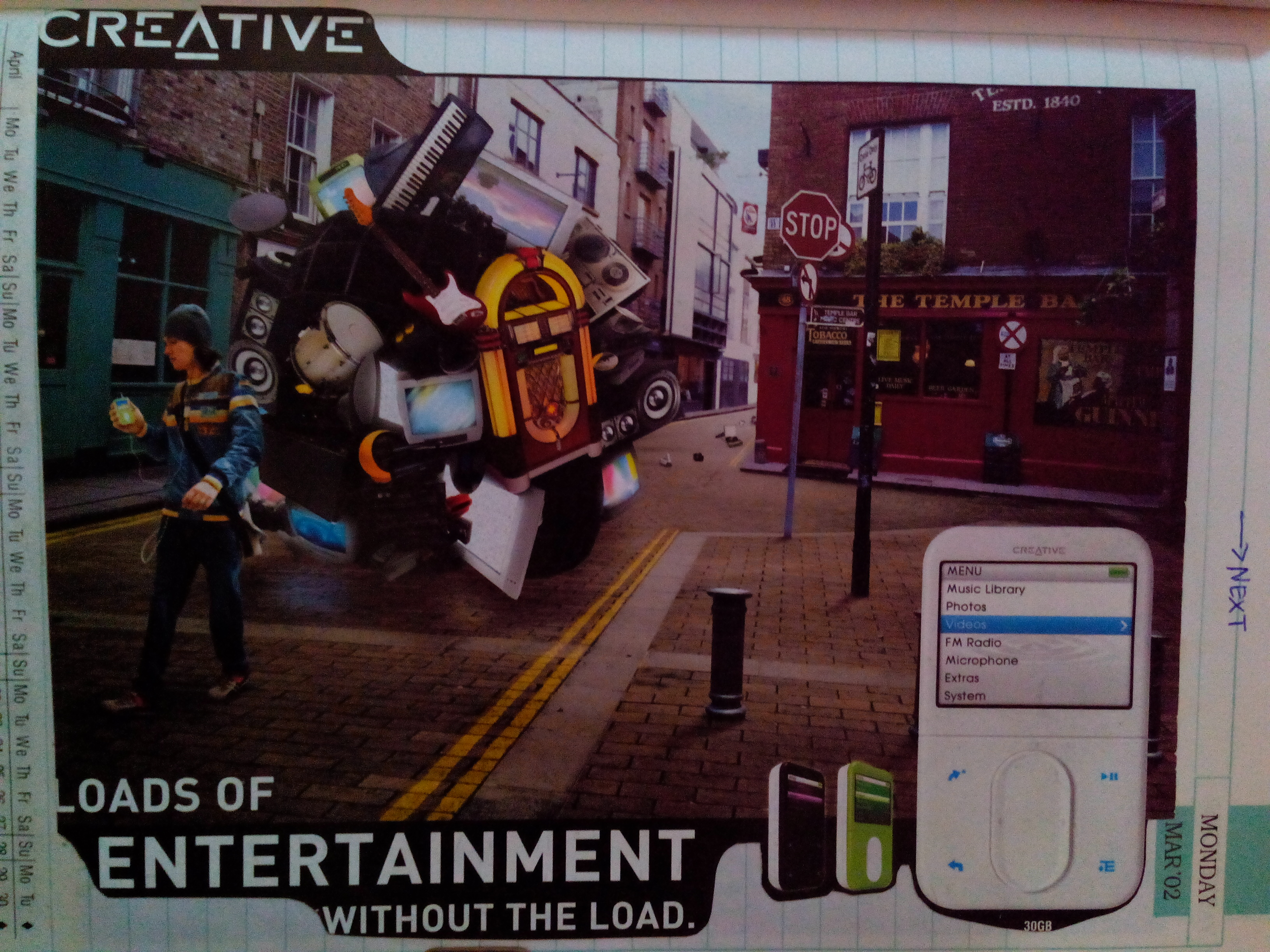
Magazine ad for ZEN Vision:M

Creative Labs was known for its fierce rivalry against Apple, at one point "declaring war" with the iPod, but the Zen line never managed to gain a significant foothold against the iPod.

In November 2004, Creative Labs announced a $100 million marketing campaign to promote their digital audio products, including the ZEN range of MP3 players. In particular, the company was heavily publicizing the Zen Touch and ZEN Micro. These two products had been featured in an increasing number of television commercials, print ads, and urban billboards.

Many celebrities were seen with the ZEN Micro, including Paris Hilton, pop group Maroon 5 and Aerosmith's Steven Tyler.

== Legal issues ==
Creative Labs, the American subsidiary of Creative Technology Limited, was awarded a patent on a music management interface (commonly seen on audio players, including the Apple iPod) by the US Patent and Trademark Office on 25 August 2005, having applied for it on 5 January 2001. Apple had filed for a similar patent on 22 October 2002 but that application was rejected. At the launch of the Vision:M, Creative announced that it would "aggressively pursue" respect of its patents, addressing "all manufacturers that use the same navigation system." So far, Creative has only addressed Apple's infringement of its patent. Creative announced on 15 May 2006, that it had launched a lawsuit against Apple for the infringement of the ZEN patent (Creative also asked the US Trade Commission to investigate whether Apple was breaching trade laws by importing iPods into the US), which was then counter-sued by Apple on the same day, filing two lawsuits for infringing their patents. Subsequently, Apple and Creative reached a settlement, with Apple paying $100 million to Creative, and Creative joining the "Made for iPod" accessory program.

== Sales and market share ==
Sales of Creative's MP3 players (which included the MuVo line along with the Zen) significantly decreased after about 2005, leading to a financial loss in 2006. This was due to tough competition in North America and Asia. However Creative continued to sell in high numbers in Europe. Continental Europe provided the most sales for Creative Labs.

As of Q2 2005, Creative (which included the MuVo line along with the Zen) held a 3.6% share in the American MP3 player market, placing it second behind Apple. A year later its share was 4.3%, but dropped to third behind SanDisk. In Q1 2007 its market share was about 4% before dropping to 2% in Q1 2008. In 2009 it dropped to 1%.

Its global market share in 2007 was 6%.

== Software ==
=== Official software ===
Creative distributes official software with many of their players to help users manage their player.

- Creative Centrale
- Creative MediaSource
- Creative Media Explorer - Each player has their own version of Media Explorer to comply with format compatibility.
- ZENcast Organizer - A Podcast organizer
- Creative Video Converter

=== Alternative software ===
Third-party alternatives have been developed to enable legacy OS compatibility as well as compatibility with other operating systems.

- Free software:
  - Amarok, a Linux media player
  - Rhythmbox, a Linux music player
  - Banshee, another media player for Linux
  - Gnomad2, which can transfer files to ZEN players with an FTP-like interface for Linux
  - KZenExplorer, a synchronization tool for KDE
  - XNJB, a synchronization tool for Mac OS X
  - A generic USB mass storage device driver allows hassle-free transfer of music on older OSes
- Proprietary software:
  - Legacy OS Driver, a Creative driver that gives compatibility to PlaysForSure-certified ZENs for Windows 98 SE, Me, and 2000.
  - MediaMonkey, a media player that syncs with ZEN players. While the basic edition is freeware, the commercial Gold version has the ability to automatically convert media formats.
  - Notmad Explorer, a software suite from Red Chair Software that allows for file and playlist management for ZEN players.
