= Sansa Fuze+ =

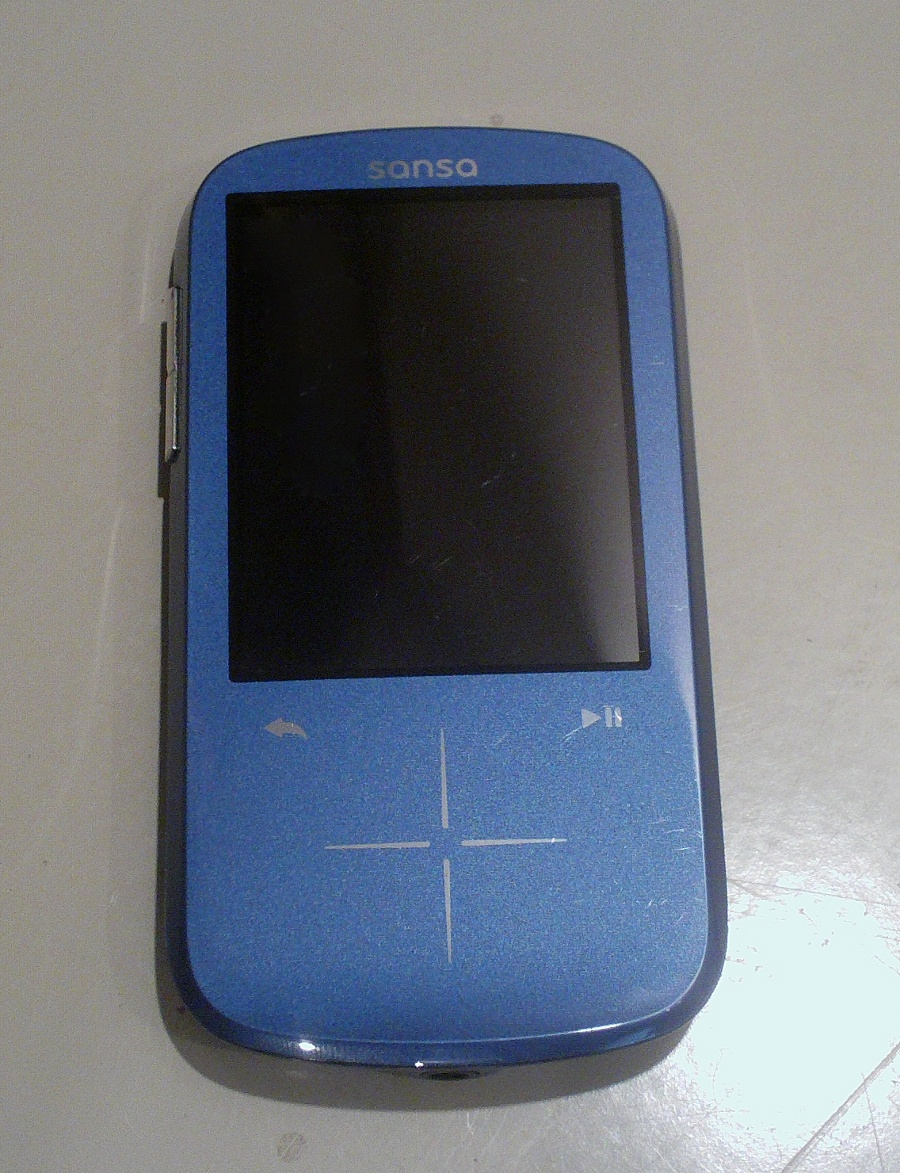
- Sansa Fuze+ (Blue)
- Manufacturer: SanDisk
- Type: Portable media player
- Lifespan: Since September 1, 2010
- Media: MicroSDHC up to 32 GB and 4, 8, or 16 gigabytes internal flash memory
- Operating system: Sansa OS 02.38.06A
- Display: 2.4-inch 320×240 pixel QVGA LCD
- Input: Touchpad
- Connectivity: USB 2.0 (MSC and MTP)
- Power: Lithium-ion battery
- Predecessor: Sansa Fuze
- Related: Sansa e200 series Sansa c200 series Sansa Clip

The Sansa Fuze+ is a portable media player manufactured by SanDisk as part of their Sansa line of MP3 players. The Fuze+ was released on September 1, 2010, and is the direct successor to the Sansa Fuze. The Sansa Fuze+ is available in five colors: black, blue, purple, red, and white. Internal storage capacities of the player vary by color.

== Features ==
The Fuze+ supports playback of common audio file formats, including MP3, WMA, Secure WMA, Ogg Vorbis, FLAC, and AAC, as well as Audible, and Podcast formats. Tag data and album art associated with audio files are shown on the Fuze+'s 2.4-inch QVGA display during playback. The Fuze+ features video playback as well and is able to handle HD videos; however the player only supports MP4 and WMV video files. JPEG and PNG images can be viewed on the Fuze+ although this feature is not heavily advertised by SanDisk. The most notable feature of the Sansa Fuze+ is the built-in microSDHC card reader that allows the player's memory to be expanded by up to 32 GB. The reader will also take Sansa's slotRadio cards. Additional hardware features of the Fuze+ include a built-in FM radio (with RDS support) and a built-in microphone. Both the radio and microphone are able to record up to five hours of audio onto the player if space allows. Unlike its predecessors that used a proprietary USB connector, the Fuze+ uses a Micro-USB type B plug to connect to computers and recharge the battery. The use of a Micro-USB connector makes the Fuze+ more universal than Sansa's previous players, but makes it incompatible with older accessories designed specifically for Sansa players. Unlike the Fuze's physical buttons, the Fuze+ comes with a touchpad for interaction.

=== Storage capacity ===
The Fuze+ is available with varying amounts of internal storage space: 4, 8, and 16 gigabyte models are all sold. The Fuze+ also comes in five different colors, however the availability of internal storage capacities vary based on the color of the player

Player size availability by color
Color	Available player sizes
Black	4 GB, 8 GB, 16 GB
Blue	4 GB, 8 GB
White	8 GB
Red	4 GB
Purple	8 GB

=== Rockbox support ===
The Sansa Fuze+ has its own stable port of Rockbox that expands greatly the capacity of the original software. For instance, with a full battery charge, the device can play music for more than 40 hours when the original firmware usually last far less than 20 hours.

== See also ==
- SanDisk
- SanDisk Sansa
- Sansa c200 Series
- Sansa e200 series
- Sansa Fuze
