= Sansa e200 series =

SanDisk portable media player

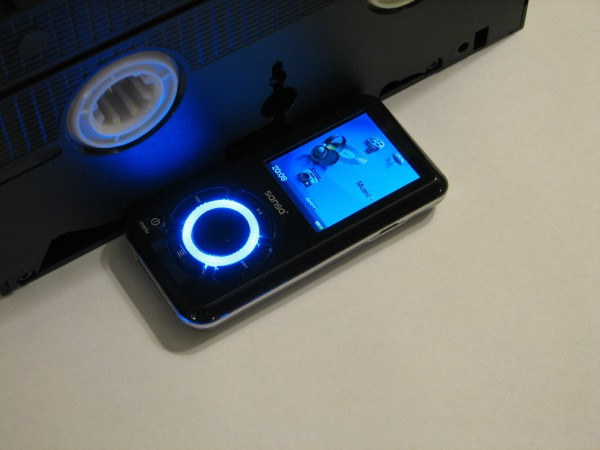
- Manufacturer: SanDisk
- Type: Portable media player Digital audio player
- Released: January 5, 2006
- Media: JPEG(v2 only), bitmap, MP3, QuickTime, WMA
- Operating system: Proprietary firmware or Rockbox
- CPU: v1-2x80 MHz PortalPlayer PP5024 (ARM7TDMI) v2-250MHz AMS3525 (ARM9TDMI)
- Storage: 2/4/6/8 GB flash memory
- Display: 1.8-inch TFT LCD 220x176 px by VPtech BEIJING API
- Input: Scroll ring
- Power: Lithium ion battery
- Online services: Microsoft PlaysForSure, Rhapsody
- Dimensions: 3.5" x 1.7" x 0.6" in.
- Weight: 2.7 oz.
- Predecessor: Sansa e100 series
- Successor: Sansa Fuze

The Sansa e200 series is a portable media player developed by SanDisk and released on January 5, 2006. The device is available in four capacities of Flash memory: 2 GB (e250), 4 GB (e260), 6 GB (e270), and 8 GB (e280). All players have a 1.8-inch, TFT LCD with a resolution of 176 by 220 pixels. Certain files, if not in a format accepted by the player's original firmware, must first be converted with the Sansa Media Converter Windows software. This will convert images to bitmap format (.bmp) and videos to MJPEG (in a .mov container), for v1 models. On v2 players it will convert videos to DivX and simply resize images. It is not possible to simply copy videos to the device, even if they seem to be in the correct format; trying to access them displays an error message.

== Features ==
The Sansa e200 series can display album art and display song information, thanks to the audio files' ID3 content. The players are powered by a user-replaceable (offered as replacement set by SanDisk and some competitors) lithium-ion battery that is also rechargeable and come with a built-in expansion slot for microSD cards, an FM tuner with a recording function (only available in North America, Japan, New Zealand, Australia and some other countries), and microphone for voice recording.

SanDisk released a version 2 of the e200 series in December 2007 with internal hardware different from the first version. Version 2 changes include support for Rhapsody channels through RhapPFS DRM (Plays For Sure enhanced to support Rhapsody channels), support for Audible audio books, microSDHC, and DivX, and also has a different boot screen and adds the ability to format the device, among other minor improvements.

== Issues ==
The player lacks Asian text support when displaying song names and artists, but users can patch the firmware to add support. Rockbox firmware also supports the e200 series just as it supports the c200 series and adds the same features.

The standard firmware for e200 models with version 1 hardware is not compatible with the newer microSDHC format (generally 4 GB and higher); Rockbox firmware adds this support. Rockbox also supports e200 models with version 2 hardware.

A number of bugs in the firmware cause problems. One introduces a 0.2 second delay between tracks, even those that are consecutive to a given album. This is most noticeable on musical tracks where the song does not fade completely out before the next begins. Artists whose names begin with "The" are listed incorrectly as well. For unknown reasons, the order of tracks on a given album play in alphabetical order, seriously disrupting the continuity of the listening experience.

The early firmware for version 2 units (firmware version information is under Settings >> Info) removed the ability for unsupported operating systems (Linux, FreeBSD, etc.) to see the internal storage as a standard flash drive when plugged in via the USB port. Version 1 players had a menu option under the Settings menu for storage mode that could be toggled to show up as standard USB flash drive. For V2 Sansa players with firmware version V03.01.11, this option has been completely removed from the settings menu. Upgrading to later firmware versions, V03.01.14 or V03.01.16 will restore the USB Mode menu option under the Settings menu. Under the USB Mode menu are three choices - Auto Detect, Media Transfer Protocol (MTP), and USB mass-storage class (MSC). MSC is Mass Storage Class where the computer would see the Sansa as a regular flash drive. MTP is Media Transfer Protocol which is a Microsoft-specific mode invented to deal with media files that include digital rights management.

== e200R Series ==
The Sansa e200R was released in October 2006. Physically identical to the regular Sansa e200, this player was sold exclusively at Best Buy, or directly through Rhapsody, the RealNetworks digital music store. The main differences in the e200R are the firmware and bootloader, which are not easily interchangeable with the e200. Models with smaller capacities received about 1 GB of pre-loaded content, while bigger ones had approximately 2 GB. It also anti-aliases the text displayed and has different names for the USB modes. The player has a feature called "Rhapsody Channels", which is the online service's brand of podcasting, and also comes with pre-loaded content. Pre-loaded content was a combination of songs from a trial period of Rhapsody after which they were automatically deleted, and a set of fixed songs. The table below shows the songs that remained after the trial period of Rhapsody was over:

List of songs shipped with various Sansa Models (other than downloaded Rhapsody content)
#	Title	Album	Year	Artist
1	Cobblestone Waltz	Lillian (album)	2005	Alias & Ehren
2	Starting To Turn	I Hate Music	2007	Andrew Paul Woodworth
3	Mona Lisa	Chimera	2006	Chris Clouse
4	The Music	Up To Something	2006	Felonius
5	Danny Boy	Franc d'Ambrosio's Hollywood: Songs from the Silver Screen	2007	Franc D'Ambrosio
6	You Closer	Siren Songs	2005	Gretchen Lieberum
7	Return Of The Champion	Survival Guide For The End Of Time	2002	Heavyweight Dub Champion
8	Morning After	When The Muse Visits	2003	Kevin Carlberg
9	Swingset Chain	It's Yours to Keep	2004	Loquat
10	Fumaza	Magia	2001	Los Pinguos
11	Leaving Hollywood	Tranquilizer	2006	Recliner
12	Wax Museum	Ship In The Attic, Birds In The Subway	2005	The Red Thread
13	Little Black Backpack	Cafe Cuts	2006	Stroke 9
15	Highway Appeal	West By God	2000	The Caroline Movement
16	Angel	Any Day Now	2005	The Jones Gang
17	Major and Minor	Musique Magnifique	2007	The Procession
18	Babylon Of The Orient	The Shanghai Restoration Project	2005	Shanghai Restoration Project
19	Even Rats	Eisenhower	2006	The Slip
20	Women Wine And Song	Safety in Numbers	2006	Umphrey's McGee

== See also ==
- SanDisk
- SanDisk Sansa
- Sansa c200 Series
- Sansa Fuze
