= Sansa Fuze =

2008 portable media player by SanDisk

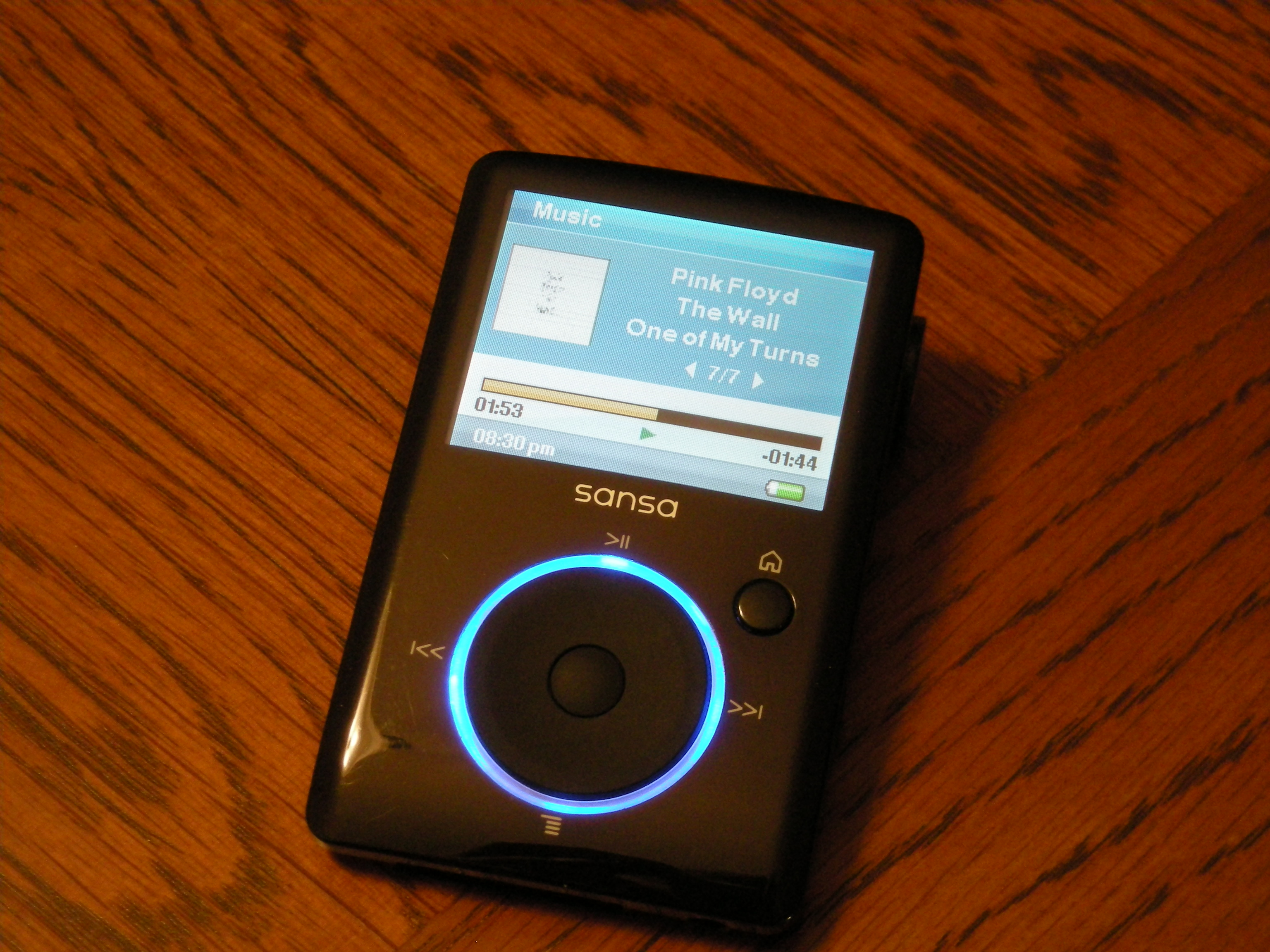
- 1st generation Sansa Fuze 4GB
- Manufacturer: SanDisk
- Type: Portable media player
- Lifespan: Since March 8, 2008
- Media: MicroSDHC up to 32 GB and 2, 4, or 8 gigabytes internal flash memory
- Operating system: Proprietary firmware or Rockbox
- Display: 1.9 inch 220×176 pixel TFT LCD
- Input: Click wheel
- Connectivity: USB 2.0 (MSC and MTP)
- Power: Lithium ion battery
- Predecessor: Sansa e200 series
- Successor: Sansa Fuze+
- Related: Sansa e200 series Sansa c200 Series; Sansa Clip

Sansa Fuze Firmware
- Stable release: 1.02.31 and 2.03.33 / January 20, 2010; 16 years ago

The Sansa Fuze is a portable media player developed by SanDisk and released on March 8, 2008. The Fuze is available in three different Flash memory capacities: 2 GB, 4 GB, and 8 GB and comes in six different colors: black, blue, pink, red, silver, and white. Storage is expandable via a microSDHC slot with capacity up to 32 GB, and unofficially to 64 GB or more via FAT32 formatted SDXC cards. All models have a 1.9 inch TFT LCD with a resolution of 220 by 176 pixels and a built-in monaural microphone and FM tuner; recordings of the latter two are saved as PCM WAV files.

== Media support ==
The Fuze supports MP3, WMA, PCM WAV, and, since the 1.01.15 firmware revision, OGG Vorbis and FLAC audio codecs. The Fuze can display both pictures and videos, both of which must first be converted with the Sansa Media Converter software for Windows; this program converts images to BMP format and videos to DivX-AVI, with specific parameters that make the media compatible with the device. Alternatively, the open-source, platform-independent Video4Fuze application can be used. Video4Fuze offers more options and the ability to save the file to a computer instead of having the device plugged in every time one wants to convert a file. The Sansa Fuze supports media playlist types of .m3u and .wpl.

As of the 1.02.26 and 2.02.26 firmware revisions, Fuze now supports ReplayGain for MP3, WMA (non-DRM only), Vorbis and FLAC, which utilizes any ReplayGain metadata that has been encoded into the media files. Also, navigation by folder was implemented as an addition to browsing by metadata.

== Operation ==
The Sansa Fuze is compatible with Microsoft Windows, Linux, and Mac OS X when USB mode is set to MSC as a drag and drop USB mass storage device. The player can also function as a Windows Media 10 and up device when USB mode is set to MTP. The Fuze's USB cable utilizes a proprietary connector that is compatible with its predecessor, the e200 series, as well as the c200 series. It has a mechanical scroll wheel (as opposed to the touch sensor on an iPod). Also unlike an iPod, powering the device off cuts all power usage (except for the clock) completely, rather than switching to a sleep mode that merely shuts down its visible operation. The Fuze has a MicroSDHC slot that can be used for standard media storage and for the proprietary Sansa services known as Slotradio and Slotmusic. The connector on the Fuze supports Line Out Dock (LOD) which is preferred to power an external amp, bypassing the internal headphone amplifier.

== Software ==
Sandisk includes the Sansa Media Converter to convert video and photos for use on the player. Equivalent open-source packages also exist, such as Video4Fuze.

For editing playlists, the Sansa Fuze supports Windows Media Player (in MTP mode), Winamp (in MSC mode) and YAPL for Fuze (in MSC mode). In auto detect, one can view the files like one views them on a hard drive. One can add music through these programs or just drag and drop via a file browser like Windows Explorer. Alternatively, one may install open source Rockbox firmware, which supports numerous formats and offers greater flexibility.

== Fuze+ ==
The Sansa Fuze+, announced on August 31, 2010 in capacities of 4 GB (US$79), 8 GB (US$89) & 16 GB (US$119), is a portable media player with a 2.4-inch color display (QVGA) and a touchpad. It also features an FM radio with FM recording, a voice recorder, and 24 hours of audio playback from a single charge. It supports the following audio formats: MP3, WMA, Secure WMA, Ogg Vorbis, FLAC, AAC, Audible, Podcasts. For video it supports MPEG-4, H.264, and WMV. Storage is expandable via a microSDHC slot, and it can be used to play slotMusic and slotRadio cards.

== See also ==
- SanDisk
- SanDisk Sansa
- Sansa c200 Series
- Sansa e200 series
