= Dock connector =

Bus and power connector in laptops and mobile devices

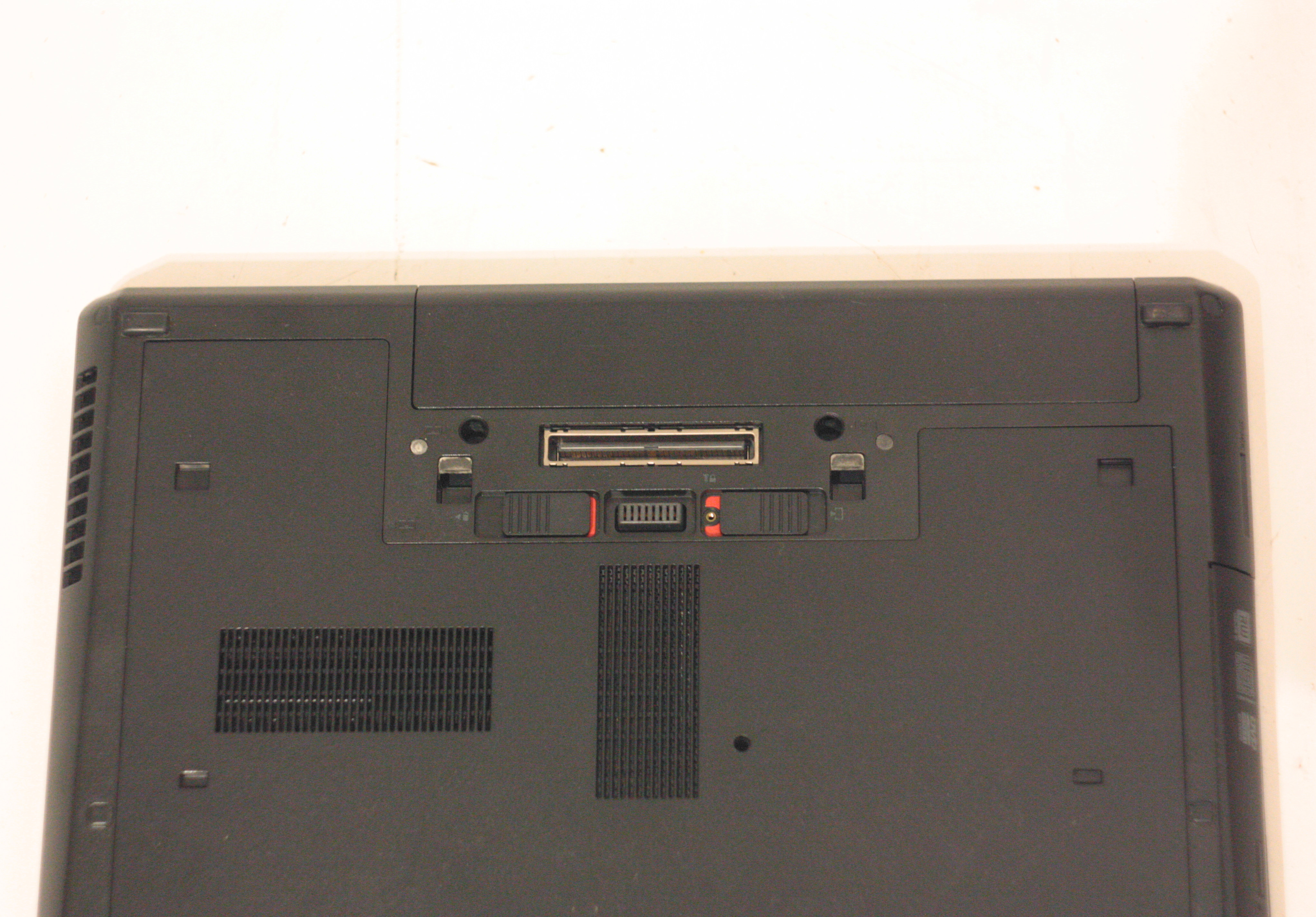
Dock connector on a 2011's HP EliteBook laptop

A dock connector is an electrical connector used to attach a mobile device simultaneously to multiple external resources. Dock connectors typically carry a variety of signals and power, through a single connector, to simplify the process of docking the device. A dock connector may be embedded in a mechanical fixture used to support or align the mobile device or may be at the end of a cable.

While dock connectors were originally associated with laptops, many other mobile devices now use them.

== Laptops ==
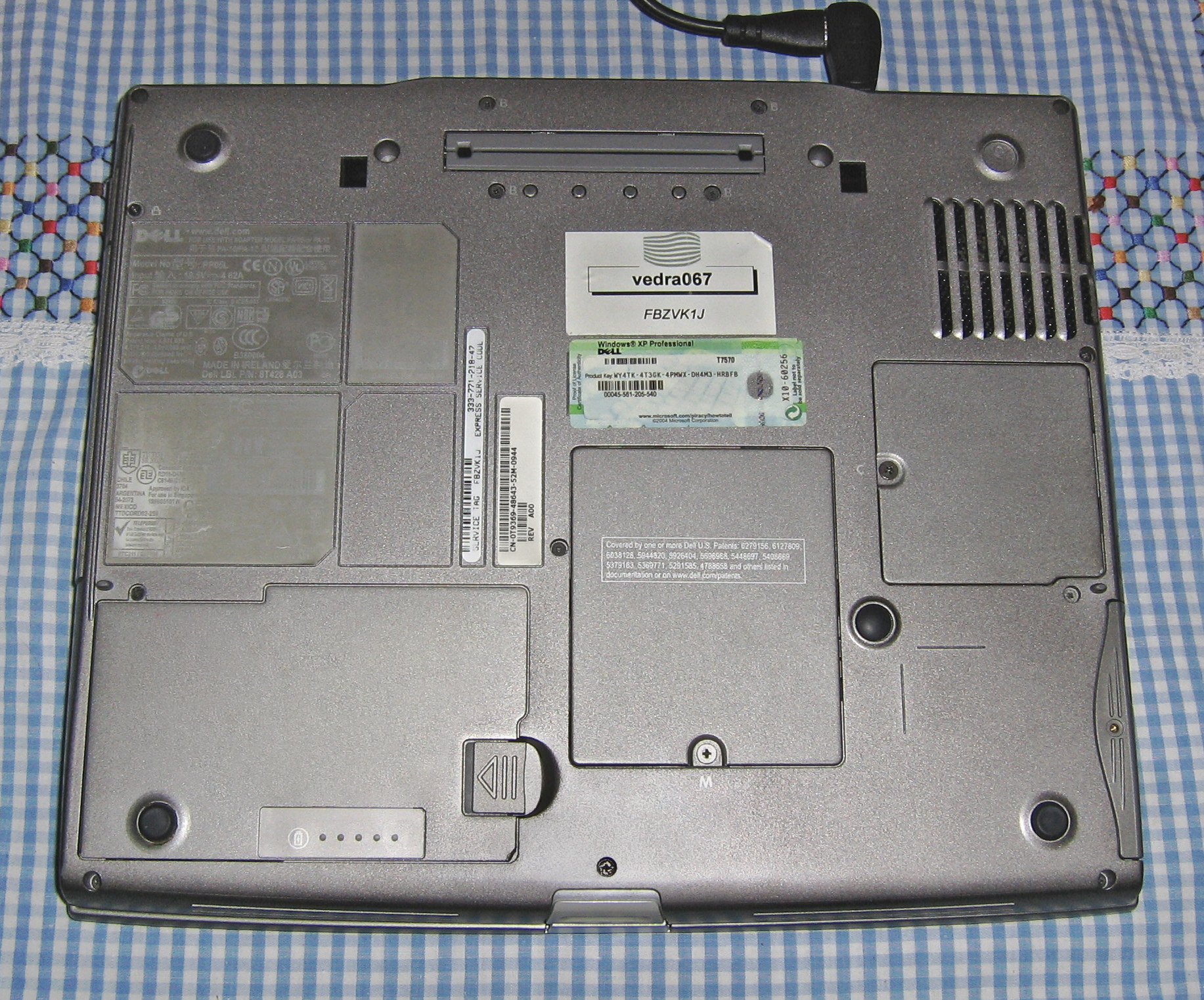
2003's Dell Latitude laptop with dock connector (parallel to top edge)

Classic docking connectors for laptop computers are usually embedded into a mechanical docking station and port replicator devices that supports and aligns the laptop and sports various single-function ports and a power source that are aggregated into the docking connector. Docking connectors carried interfaces such as keyboard, serial, parallel, and video ports from the laptop and supply power to it.

As of 2020, docking connection options usually can be defined as a USB-C port with optional additional functionality.

== Mobile devices ==
Many mobile devices feature a dock connector.

Dock connectors can be used to interface with accessories such as external speakers, including stereo systems and clock radios. Automotive accessories for mobile devices include charging cradles, FM transmitters for playing audio through the car's speakers, and GPS receivers. There are dock connector cables that offer additional capabilities such as direct integration with the car's audio system and controls.

=== Apple dock connectors ===
==== 30-pin dock connector ====
Apple 30-pin dock connector
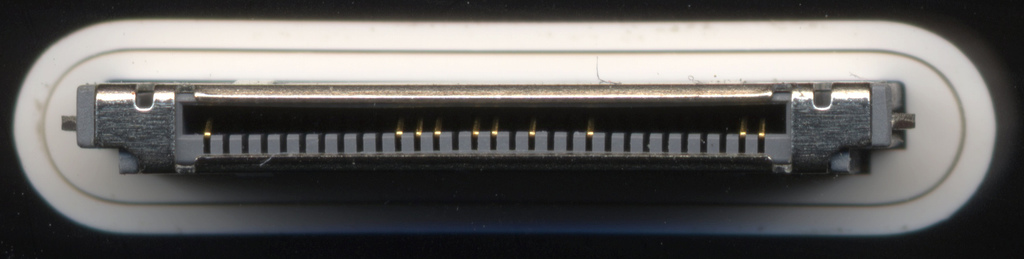
- 30-pin connector
- Type: Data and power connector

Production history
- Designer: Apple Inc.
- Designed: 2003
- Manufacturer: Apple Inc.
- Produced: 2003 – 2014 (2016 for India)
- Superseded by: Lightning (September 12, 2012)

General specifications
- Pins: 30

Apple's proprietary 30-pin connector was common to most Apple mobile devices (iPhone (1st generation), 3G, 3GS, 4, 4S), 1st through 4th generation iPod Touch, iPad, iPad 2, and iPad (3rd generation)) from its introduction with the 3rd generation iPod classic in 2003 until the Lightning connector was released in late 2012. Originally, the Apple dock connector carried USB, FireWire, some controls and line-level audio outputs. As the iPod changed, so did the signals in the dock connector. Video was added to the connector. FireWire was phased out of the iPods, which led to a discontinuity in usage of the dock connector.

As a result of the popularity of Apple's iPod and iPhone devices using the connector, a cottage industry was created of third-party devices that could connect to the interface. With the discontinuation of the sixth-generation 160 GB iPod Classic and the iPhone 4S, the last Apple products to feature the original 30-pin connector, the dock connector was discontinued in September 2014 with production of 30-pin connectors in India and developing markets ending in February 2016.

===== Supported iPhones =====
- iPhone (1st generation)
- iPhone 3G
- iPhone 3GS
- iPhone 4
- iPhone 4S

==== Lightning connector ====
Apple Lightning connector
- Lightning connector
- Type: Data and power connector

Production history
- Designer: Apple Inc.
- Designed: 2012
- Manufacturer: Apple Inc.
- Produced: 2012–2025
- Superseded by: USB-C (November 7, 2018)

General specifications
- Pins: 8

Pinout
- Pin out
- Pins on Lightning connector
- For pinout details, see Lightning (connector).

Apple introduced an 8-pin dock connector, named Lightning, on September 12, 2012, as replacement of the 30-pin dock connector. The iPhone 5 to iPhone 14 series, the fifth- to seventh-generation iPod touch, seventh-generation iPod nano, first- to fifth-generation iPad mini, the fourth- to ninth-generation iPad, the first- to third-generation iPad Air, and the first- and second-generations of the iPad Pro used the Lightning connector, as do some Apple accessories. Apple Lightning connector pins can be accessed from both sides of the connector allowing reversibility.

Since the release of the 3rd generation of iPad Pro, the Lightning connector is being phased out in favor of the more universal USB-C. The transition was complete for all new models of iPads since March 18, 2022 and iPhones since September 22, 2023.

=== Samsung 30-pin dock connector ===
Samsung 30-pin dock connector
- Type: Data and power connector

Production history
- Designer: Samsung

General specifications
- Pins: 30

The Samsung Galaxy Tab and Galaxy Note 30-pin dock/charging connector is very similar to – although not identical with – the non-proprietary PDMI connector. It is unrelated to the Apple 30-pin connector.

=== Korean standard cellular phone 24-pin and 20-pin dock connectors ===
Korean standard cellular phone dock connector (TTAS.KO-06.0028)
- Type: Data and power connector

Production history
- Designer: Korean Telecommunications Technology Association (TTA)
- Produced: 2001

General specifications
- Pins: 20 (24 pre-2007)

The 2001 Korean Telecommunications Technology Association (TTA) "Standard on I/O Connection Interface of Digital Cellular Phone" defined a 24-pin electromechanical interface specifications for cellular phone charging, wired data communication, analog audio, etc. The 2007 updated version has only 20 pins but added composite video output support among other changes.

=== Portable Digital Media Interface (PDMI) ===
Portable Digital Media Interface (PDMI)
Production history
- Designer: CEA
- Designed: February 2010

General specifications
- Length: 22 mm
- Width: 2.5 mm
- Hot pluggable: Yes
- External: Yes
- Audio signal: Analog stereo, digital DisplayPort (1–8 channels, 16 or 24-bit linear PCM; 32 to 192 kHz sampling rate)
- Video signal: Digital 2-lane DisplayPort 1.1, 4.32 Gbit/s data rate
- Pins: 30 pins

Data
- Data signal: USB 3.0 SuperSpeed + 1 Mbit/s for the DisplayPort auxiliary channel
- For pinout details, see PDMI (Portable Digital Media Interface).

The Portable Digital Media Interface (PDMI) is a 30-pin interconnection standard for portable media players. It was developed by the Consumer Electronics Association as ANSI/CEA-2017-A, Common Interconnection for Portable Media Players in February 2010. The standard was developed with the input or support of over fifty consumer electronics companies worldwide.

=== Sony WM-PORT ===
WM-PORT
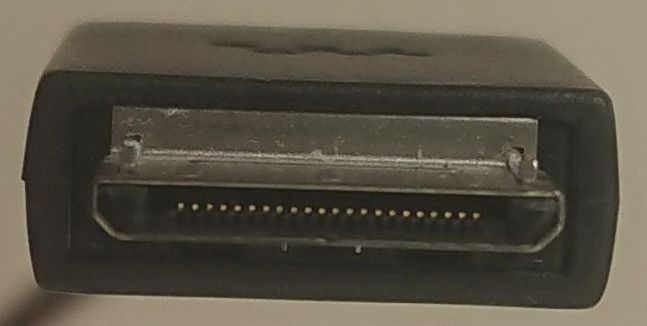
- Type: Data and power connector

Production history
- Designer: Sony
- Designed: 2006

General specifications
- Pins: 22

The WM-PORT is a 22-pin dock connector from Sony, used for the majority of Walkman digital media players since 2006. It provides a data and power connection including to peripherals.

Since the release of Walkman NW-A100 series in 2019, no new players have been released featuring the WM-PORT connector and instead use industry standard USB-C.

=== Other dock connectors ===
- Cowon iAudio 22-pin dock connector
- Creative Zen 30-pin dock connector
- iRiver 18-pin dock connector
- Le Pan 30-pin dock connector
- Microsoft Zune 24-pin dock connector
- Olympus m:robe series 18-pin dock connector
- Panasonic D-snap port (24-pin)
- Philips GoGear 30-pin dock connector
- SanDisk Sansa 30-pin dock connector
- Sony NW-A1000/3000 Walkman 42-pin multi-connector
- Tatung Elio 26-pin dock connector
- Toshiba Gigabeat 40-pin dock connector

== See also ==
- Docking station
- Common external power supply
