= E260 =

E260 may refer to:

- The E number for acetic acid, the key constituent of vinegar
- Sansa e260, a flash memory–based digital audio player
- A model of the Mercedes-Benz W124 automobile manufactured 1986–1993
