= Sansa c200 series =

Portable Media Player

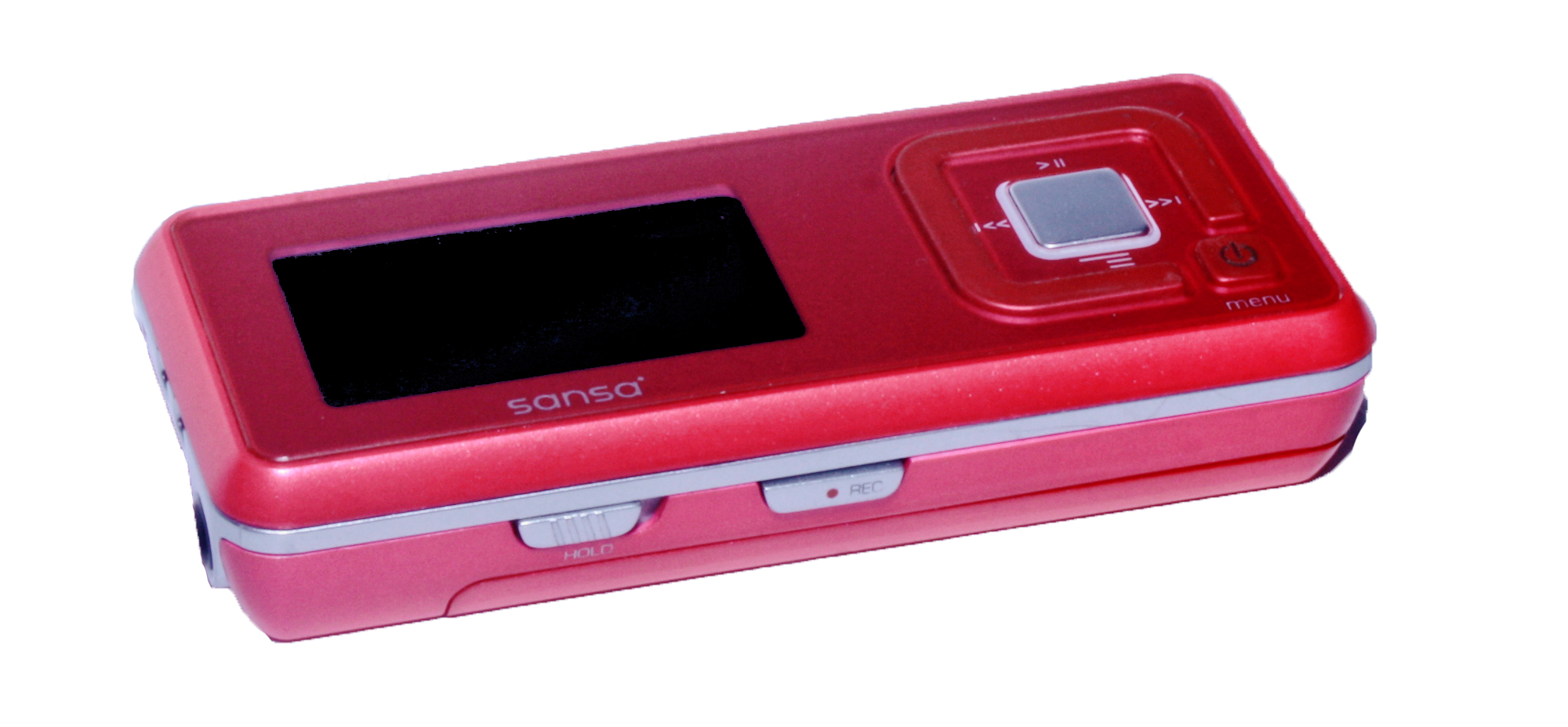
- Manufacturer: SanDisk
- Type: Portable Media Player; Digital Audio Player
- Media: JPEG(v2 only), bitmap, MP3, WMA, WAV .AA (Firmware Version 2 Only)
- Operating system: Proprietary firmware or Rockbox
- Storage: 1-2 GB flash memory by Sandisk
- Display: 1.4 inch 64k colour LCD
- Input: Keypad Buttons
- Connectivity: USB 2.0
- Power: Lithium ion battery
- Dimensions: 3.2" x 1.4" x 0.6" in. 80 x 35 x 15 mm
- Weight: 1.4 oz 40 grams
- Predecessor: Sansa c100 series
- Successor: Sansa Clip

The Sansa c200 series is a line of portable media players developed by SanDisk. The line consists of two models: the c240, 1 GB, the c250, 2 GB. Both models feature a microSD card slot, a 1.4-inch LCD, a built-in microphone, and an FM radio. c200 series players are available in four colors: black, red, pink, and blue.

== Features ==
The Sansa c200 series can play MP3, WMA, and WAV audio files and reads audio file tags to display song information such as album, artist, title and album art. c200 series players automatically sort music files into a library by tag users can browse their music by artist, album, track, genre, or year. Version 2 of the c200 firmware also supports Audible's .AA format. The player also allows users to shuffle music playlists as well as create their own. C200 series players support viewing image files in either JPEG or bitmap format, and allow users to organize photos into albums and view photo slide-shows. The c200 series features a microphone built into one end of the player; users can make voice recordings that save as WAV files in the RECORD directory on the player. An FM radio is built into the c200, the player uses the headphones as a radio antenna, so reception varies. Recordings can be made from the FM radio and are stored in the RECORD directory on the player. The c200 series features SanDisk's trademark microSD card slot. A microSD card up to 2 GB in capacity can be inserted into this slot on the c200 in order to increase the player's music storage limit. The battery is easily replaceable and requires no tools, allowing users to keep an extra battery and swap them out on the go.

== Interface ==
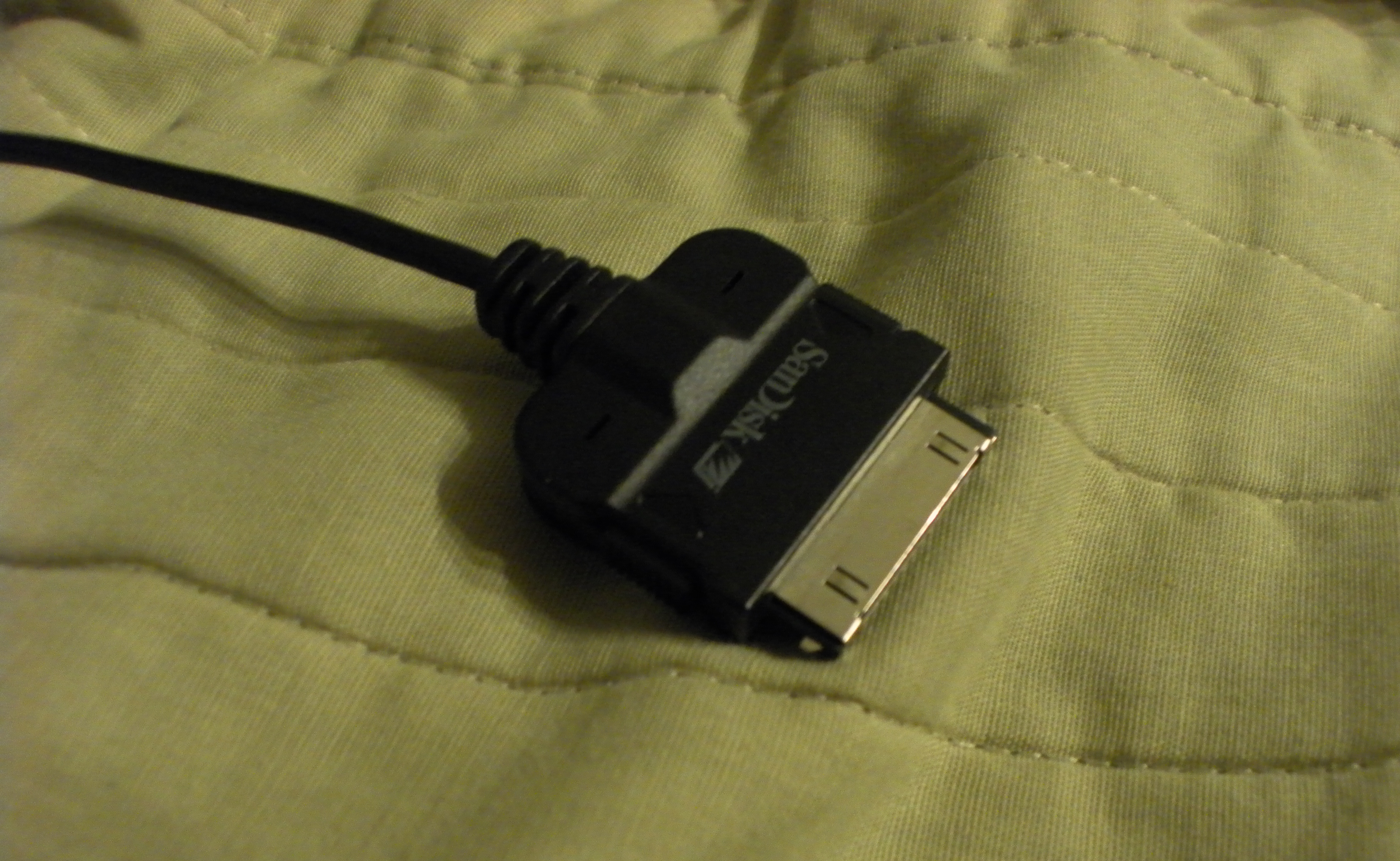
The Proprietary USB connector used by the Sansa c200 series

The graphical user interface (GUI) that comes pre-installed on Sansa c200 series players is fairly intuitive. All items on the player are organized into menus that scroll up and down. The c200 GUI is nearly identical to that of the Sansa e200 series, and uses most of the same icons. The control layout of the c200 is made up of a keypad on the right side of the player, a volume rocker on top, and record and hold switches on the bottom. The up and down buttons on the keypad allow the user to scroll through menus as one might expect, the square button in the center of the keypad is used to select menu items and the left button returns to the previous menu.

=== Transferring Media ===
C200 series players have a long rectangular port on the one end that connects to a proprietary plug on special USB 2.0 cables and power adapters. When the player is connected to a computer it will automatically enter the set USB mode. The Sansa c200 has two USB modes, MTP and MSC. In Media Transfer Protocol (MTP) mode music and photos can only be transferred to c200 series players via a media management program such as Windows Media Player or Winamp. When files are transferred to the player in MTP mode they are automatically organized by the media management software. USB Mass-storage Device Class (MSC) mode gives users more control over media on the c200 by allowing files on the player to be managed via a file manager such as Windows Explorer or Finder. MSC mode allows users to sort and tag files on the player however they see fit.

== Issues ==
The display can be an issue on the c240 and c250. The 132×80 pixel resolution of the 1.4-inch display is sub-optimal for viewing photos, and watching video. The frame-rate is also very low, making very difficult to play any of the games that come with the c200 Rockbox build. The built-in voice recorder can only record in mono. The reception of the built-in FM radio can sometimes cut out due to the use as headphones as the antenna. Like the Sansa e200, the left channel contact of the headphone jack has a tendency to disconnect from the main circuit board, but it can be repaired with solder and hot glue. Some low-power USB chargers are unable to charge the c200 battery.

== See also ==
- SanDisk
- SanDisk Sansa
- Sansa e200 series
- Sansa Fuze
