= Olympus m:robe =

Olympus m:robe was a product line of MP3 players that were produced by Olympus Corporation between 2004 and 2005. The name m:robe is a contraction of Music wardROBE. Olympus has ended production of the entire m:robe line. On October 13, 2004, Olympus released two MP3 players: the 5GB MR-100 with monochrome display and the 20GB MR-500i with colour display and built-in camera. The MR-100's release price was $249.99 (USD), and the MR-500i's release price was $499.99 (USD). The later MR-F10, MR-F20, and MR-F30 players with color screens, drag-and-drop file transferring, and FM tuning and recording were only released in Asia.

== MR:100 ==
The MR:100 was a 5GB MP3 player. It had a bright red on deep blood red 1.25 x 1 inch display which was 160 pixels wide and 128 pixels high. It also had a Synaptic touch pad for the controls that glowed red where the sensitivity pads are. The entire front was covered in a single piece of glass, and when the m:robe was turned off or idling, the front turned all black. It had a metal back painted in Pearl White, although in Japan limited numbers were also available with a Pearl Pink or Lagoon Blue back. The MR-100 used the same PortalPlayer PP5020 CPU as the iPod mini, and used a very similar interface. The player was compatible with MP3 WMA and WAV files. It included an AC adapter, a USB cable, a dock, a pair of earbuds, a headphone extension wire, a CD-ROM with the player's software, and documentation. Additional accessories included a red or black rubber sleeve and a wired remote that plugs into the MR:100.

Rockbox became fully functional on the m:robe 100 series and allowed many features not possible in the original firmware.

== MR-500i ==
The MR-500i was a 20GB MP3 player/camera combo. It had a 3.7 inch 640x480 (VGA) 262,144 color LCD touch screen. The player had the ability to play music and take photos, as well as a “remix” mode where the user could choose a song to play with a selection of photos. It came with a wired remote that allowed the user to change between songs, view the song being played, and change the volume. The remote was also available as an optional accessory for the MR:100. The back of the player was Pearl White like the original MR-100. The MR-500i supported MP3 and WMA audio files. It came with an AC adapter, a USB cable, a dock, a pair of earbuds, the m:robe remote, a CD-ROM with the player's software, and documentation.

== MR-Fxx series ==
The MR-Fxx series consisted of the MR-F10, MR-F20, and MR-F30. They were only available in Asia. They were all available with 512MB and 1GB flash memory, except the MR-F20 which only came in 512MB. They all had color screens with varying resolutions and color depth. The MR-F10 and MR-F20 had 65,536-colour organic electroluminescent displays, and the MR-F30 had a 262,144-color organic electroluminescent display. The MR-F10 was available in pearl white or gloss black, and came with an earbud neckstrap.

The MR-F20 also had a pearl white back and a piece of plastic on the front, with black behind it and recessed touch buttons (similar to the 3G iPod) that glowed red. The MR-F30 was available in white and black. The MR-F20 and MR-F30 had built-in FM tuners with aircheck functions for recording radio broadcasts. The MR-F30 and MR-F20 had a built-in voice recorders. A drag-and-drop interface could be used instead of m:trip.

== m:trip ==
The device's main software for transferring media between the player and a computer was called m:trip, and has been heavily criticised by m:robe users. The software initially only ran on Windows 2000 or Windows XP (Home and Professional), and did not support Macintosh or Linux. Later it did support Linux. M-trip software required users to “Sync” to upload music, and if syncing an m:robe from a different computer, it deleted all of the music, to prevent piracy. In addition, the program was criticised for having numerous syncing bugs.

m:trip 2.0 (2.0.0.9) was released July 5, 2006 (only for Japan), which made improvements to the software, including adding a Remix-Cube function, an automatic update/importing of music, and a new service named Olio. An English software patch was made for the 2.0 version by independent developers, but it was rendered obsolete when Olympus released version 2.1. This version created a new save folder option for remix cubes and made minor changes and additions to the remix function and to the program itself.

Various m:trip replacements have been released by independent developers. Their aim is to provide a simple unintrusive alternative to m:trip without any of its multimedia capabilities.

== RM-13 remote and cradle ==
The MR-100 could be used with an LCD remote(RM-13) and Data Sync/Charge Cradle. The RM-13 had a "Heart" Button which let the user add songs to favorite list. The RM-13 displays Track Time, Title, Battery, and Track Number. Languages supported on the RM-13 remote were English, Korean, and Japanese. However other languages could be displayed. Also RM-13 has green backlit. There are also mode and digital volume buttons.

== End of production ==
On November 9, 2005, Olympus announced that they were stopping production of the m:robes. Olympus froze the development of the next generation of m:robe products to put more resources into its digital camera and audio recording research, development, marketing and sales. Many users say that it was due to the lack of marketing — the only marketing in the United States was two Super Bowl ads. Many users also predicted this stop, due to the drop in price of the m:robes shortly before the action was taken, and the fact that the MR-100 was being sold at Radio Shack for US$100 after rebates. There were only a few accessories for the m:robes.

== See also ==
- Rockbox (alternative, open source firmware for the m:robe 100)
