= Secrets of the Sea =

Studio album by Loquat
- Released: 2008
- Label: Talking House Records
- Producer: Rondo Brothers and Loquat

Loquat chronology
It's Yours to Keep	Secrets of the Sea

Secrets of the Sea is a 2008 album by Loquat.

All lyrics are written by Kylee Swenson; all music is composed by Loquat.

No.	Title	Length
1.	"Harder Hit"
2.	"Who Can Even Remember?"
3.	"Sit Sideways"
4.	"Big Key, Little Door"
5.	"Comedown's Worse"
6.	"These Kinds of Friends"
7.	"Go Hibernate"
8.	"Clearly Now..."
9.	"In My Sleep"
10.	"Shaky Like the Flu"
11.	"Spiral Stairs or Escalators"
