= SlotMusic =

Brand of memory card with preloaded music

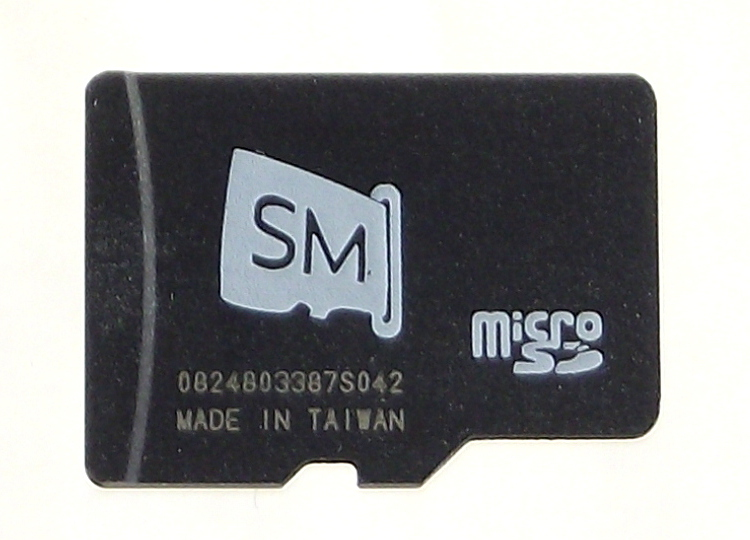
SlotMusic microSD card

slotMusic was a brand of microSD memory card developed by SanDisk preloaded with music in MP3 format. They were first available at Wal-Mart and Best Buy stores in October 2008. The selection of songs came from Universal Music Group, Sony BMG, Warner Music Group and EMI Music. As of mid-2011, SanDisk's website listed a total of 14 albums available in the SlotMusic format.

The audio files contain no digital rights management, and are encoded at minimum bitrates of 256 to 320 kbit/s.

slotMusic albums may also include high-quality images and videos in multiple formats. The contents of each microSD card may be altered by the user, enabling them to add or remove files from the slotMusic card as desired. Another type of card, slotRadio, was developed in 2009 which had radio-like controls. A slotRadio card had more restrictions on how it worked, such as not being able to backtrack to a previous song.
