= It's Yours to Keep =

Album by Loquat

Studio album by Loquat
- Released: October 1, 2004 Spain, Mexico, Portugal
- Genre: Electronica, dream pop
- Label: Jackpine Social Club

Loquat chronology
It's Yours to Keep	Secrets of the Sea

It's Yours to Keep is the first full-length studio album from electronic-pop musical group Loquat. It contains ten songs including "Swingset Chain", featured on the CW television series One Tree Hill. The album was met with generally positive reviews, though some reviewers thought it fell short of the band's talent. It reached #85 on College Music Journal's CMJ Radio 200 chart.

== Track listing ==
1. "Take it Back"
2. "Rocks"
3. "Slow, Fast, Wait and See"
4. "Swingset Chain"
5. "Need Air"
6. "Change the Station"
7. "Serial Mess"
8. "It's Yours to Keep"
9. "To the Floor"
10. "Internal Crash"
