= SlotRadio =

Proprietary music format

slotRadio
- Developed by: Sandisk
- Initial release: 2009
- Type of format: Audio
- Website: www.slotradio.com

slotRadio was a proprietary format developed by Sandisk that delivered music on a microSD memory card. Up to 1,000 songs were preloaded on microSD cards which were protected with digital rights management. Users had no direct access to the music to copy songs, organize playlists, or download the songs from the card. Songs could only be played using a Sandisk Sansa music player that supported the SlotRadio formatted microSD cards.

In January 2009, Sandisk introduced a Sansa music player with an MSRP of $99.99 that was bundled with a SlotRadio music card that included seven playlists: Alternative, Contemporary, Country, R&B/Hip-Hop, Rock, Workout, and Chillout. SlotRadio gave consumers access to a large library of music but unlike individual MP3s that were purchased, the playlist was predetermined and the user had only the ability to skip songs forward, much like a radio or music streaming service Pandora, hence the name slot "Radio".

Cards could be purchased in different musical genres such as rock, country, oldies and hip hop/R&B. Each card contains several playlists by "mood" or environment such as workout, while featuring songs from Billboard's top charting artists. SlotRadio cards were sold for $39.99.

Sandisk showed the first slotRadio player and card at CES 2009.

Sandisk stopped providing slotRadio cards on March 31, 2012.

== See also ==
- slotMusic
