= PortalPlayer =

American semiconductor company

PortalPlayer, Inc.
- Industry: Semiconductors
- Founded: 1999; 27 years ago
- Defunct: 2007
- Fate: Acquired by Nvidia
- Headquarters: United States
- Area served: Worldwide
- Products: SoCs

PortalPlayer, Inc., founded in 1999, was a fabless semiconductor company that supplied system-on-a-chip semiconductors, firmware and software for personal media players. The company handled semiconductor design and firmware development, while subcontracting the actual semiconductor manufacturing to merchant foundries.

It gained recognition as the company with which Apple contracted for the development of the original iPod. The company went public with an IPO in November 2004 and traded on the NASDAQ under ticker symbol PLAY. Sales to Apple grew to 90% of the company's gross revenue, which ultimately hurt the company when Apple switched media processor chip vendors in its iPod lines.

On January 5, 2007, Nvidia Corporation announced that it had acquired PortalPlayer, Inc. for about $357 million.

== Products ==
=== PortalPlayer 5002 ===
Dual ARM7TDMI cores with shared SRAM (3x 32KB banks). Errata in memory controller leads to halved data cache performance but fast SRAM. As the ARM7TDMI does not support cache coherency, individual ARM7TDMI cores do not have coherent views of DRAM. Custom logic is used to introduce coherency into the SRAM.

Used by the following devices:

- iPod: Generations 1, 2 and 3

=== PortalPlayer 5003 ===
System-on-a-chip containing two ARM7 CPU cores, each running at up to 90 MHz. Fixes 5002 cache bug greatly improving performance of DRAM.

Used by the following devices:

- Rio Karma

=== PortalPlayer 5020 ===
System-on-a-chip containing two ARM CPU cores, each running at 75 MHz. Expanded SRAM to 4 banks (128KB) using a crossbar style switch.

Used by the following devices:

- iPod: Generation 4, iPod Photo, and first generation iPod Mini
- Philips HDD100/120 (Unconfirmed)
- Tatung Elio M310 (system/pp5020.mi4 contains the string "PP5020AF-05.11-TG01-11.40-TG01-11.40-DT" and "Copyright(c) 1999 - 2003 PortalPlayer, Inc.")
- Virgin player 5GB
- MSI Megaplayer 540, has firmware system/pp5020.mi4 including "PP5020AF..." string, in Germany it has been sold as Medion MD81034 by ALDI
- iriver H10, all variations, including the 5GB, 6GB, and 20GB models
- Edirol R-1 (Unconfirmed rumor on what chip but unit displays "Powered by PortalPlay Inc. 1999-2004"
- M-AUDIO Microtrack ver.1 " string pp5020d-tf"
- Olympus m:robe MR-100

=== PortalPlayer 5021C-TDF ===
Used by the following devices:

- iPod: First generation iPod Nano and fifth generation iPod with video

=== PortalPlayer 5022 ===
SRAM is no longer partitioned into fast and slower banks; all have uniform access speed.

Used by the following devices:

- iPod: Second generation iPod Mini
- Philips: GoGear HDD1630/HDD6320/HDD6330 > PP 5022 + codec Wolfson WM8731L

=== PortalPlayer 5024 ===
PP5022 with integrated Austria Microsystems AS3514 DAC and power management chip.

Used by the following devices:

- Sandisk Sansa e200 series
- Philips GoGear SA9200

=== PortalPlayer APX ===
PortalPlayer's application processor series.

Used by:

- Microsoft Zune HD
- The current generation NVIDIA Tegra mobile processors
