= SanDisk portable media players =

Line of portable media players

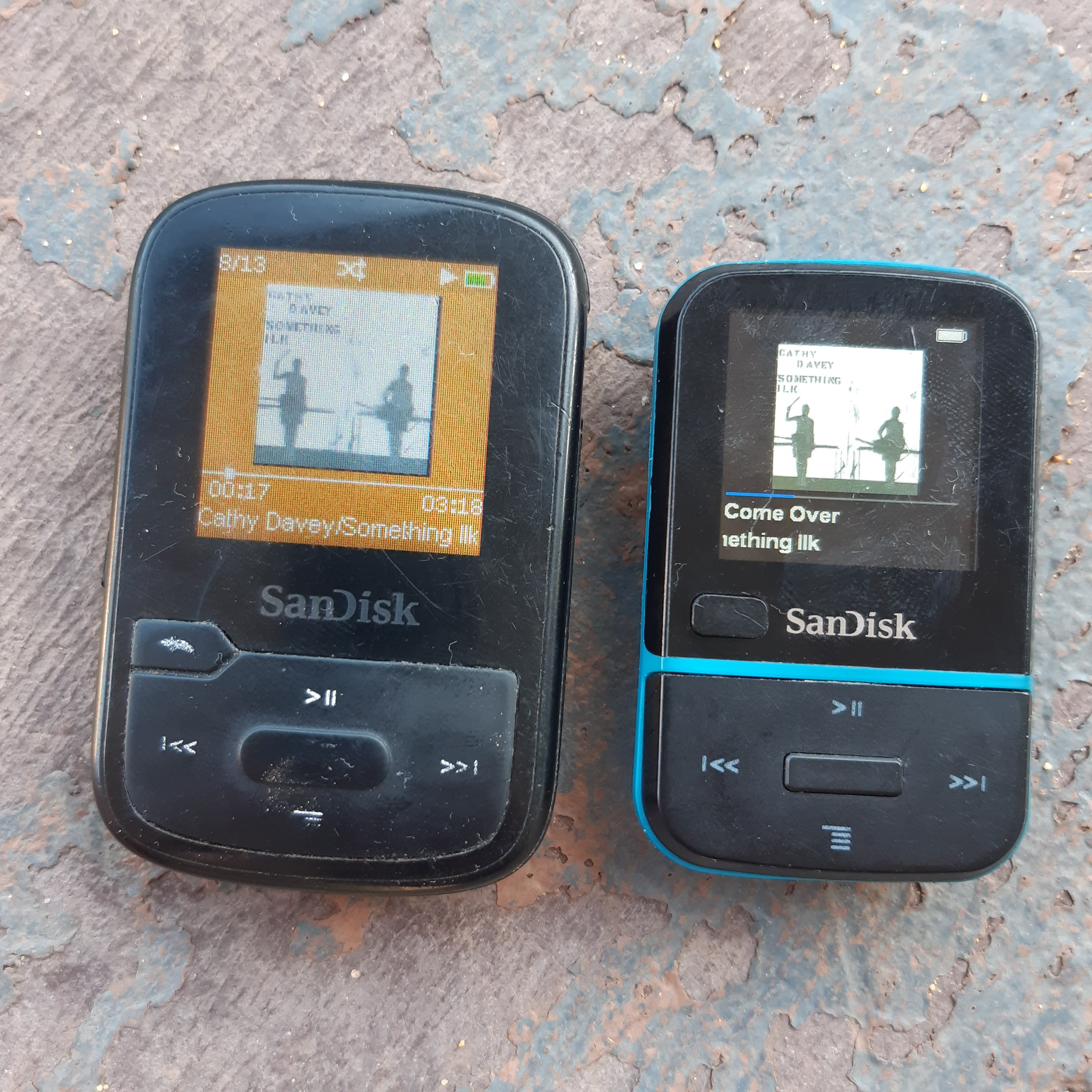
SanDisk Clip Sport Plus 16GB (left) and Clip Sport Go 32GB (right)

SanDisk has produced a number of flash memory-based portable media players from 2005. SanDisk players were marketed under the Sansa name until 2014, then SanDisk Clip.

== Model history ==
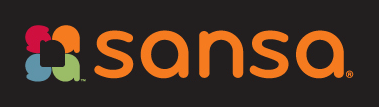
The older SanDisk Sansa logo

=== Sansa e100 ===
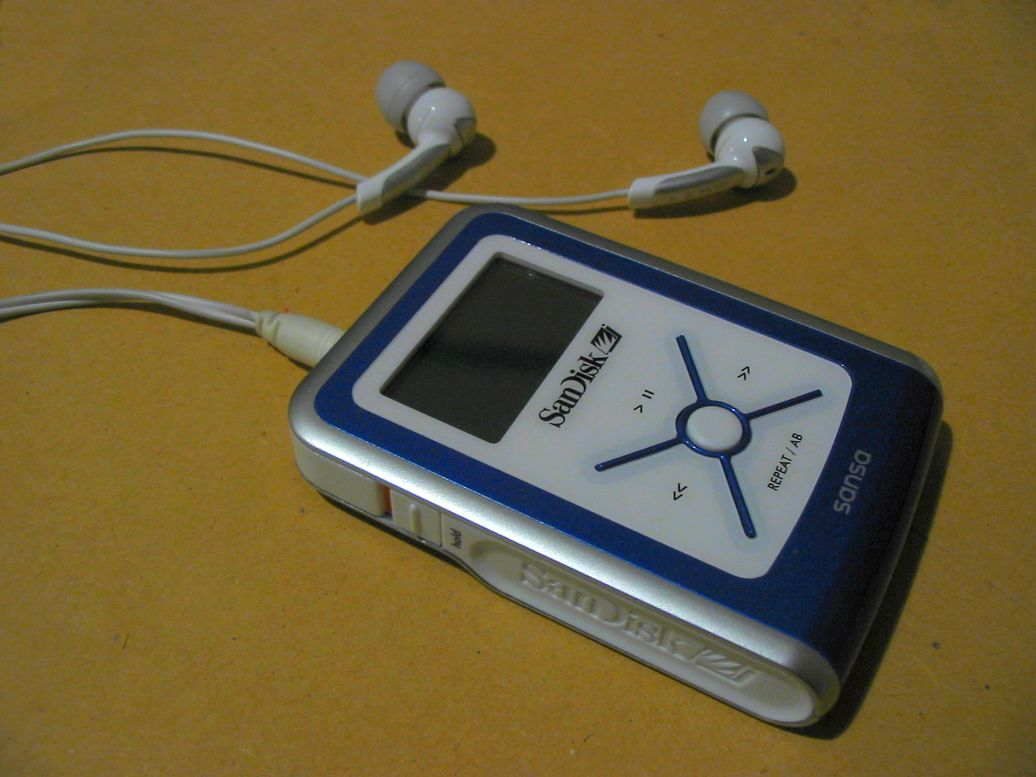
Sansa e130 in blue

The Sansa e100 series has a monochrome display with a blue backlight, FM tuner with 20 presets, SRS WOW technology, an SD card slot supporting cards up to 2 GB, an internal memory of 512 MB (e130) or 1 GB (e140), and a single AAA battery for power. It supports MP3, WMA and Audible file formats. The e140 was also known as the SDMX2. Released on January 12, 2006, it came in blue or grey, depending on the model.

=== SanDisk SDMX1 ===
The SanDisk SDMX1 series (including the SDMX1-1024, −512, and −256—reflecting capacity in MB), also known as the SanDisk Digital Audio Player, is a low-end solid state memory MP3 player. It was SanDisk's first personal media player, and the only one of its time not to be sold under the Sansa brand. It supports MP3, WMA, and DRM-protected WMA files. It cannot play seamlessly, and imposes a non-configurable fade at the beginning and end of each file. There is a built-in microphone for low-fidelity (8 kHz) voice recording and an FM radio. The SanDisk SDMX1 is powered by a single AAA battery for around 15 hours of continuous playback. It measures 75.2 mm x 32.8 mm x 20.8 mm and weighs under 40 g (1.4 oz). Its release date was January 11, 2006.

=== Sansa m200 ===
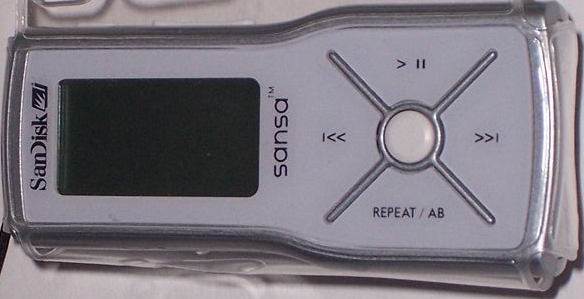
Sansa m240 in grey

The Sansa m200 series was released in four models: m230 (512MB), m240 (1 GB), m250 (2 GB), and m260 (4 GB). It has a built-in FM tuner and microphone, and supports MP3, WMA, WAV, and Audible (.aa) audio file formats. It comes in different colors (one for each memory size) such as blue, black, pink, and grey, and uses a single AAA battery for power. There were four different hardware revisions of this player. The first three revisions used a Telechips TCC770 SoC for a CPU and DSP, and the fourth used a chip developed by Austria Microsystems that was also used in the Clip, Fuze, and later e200/c200 models.

=== Sansa c100 ===
The Sansa c100-series players have colour displays and are able to show cover art and small picture thumbnails. They use AAA batteries and are available in 1 GB (c140) or 2 GB (c150) of capacity. Microphone and radio capabilities are included.

=== Sansa e200 ===
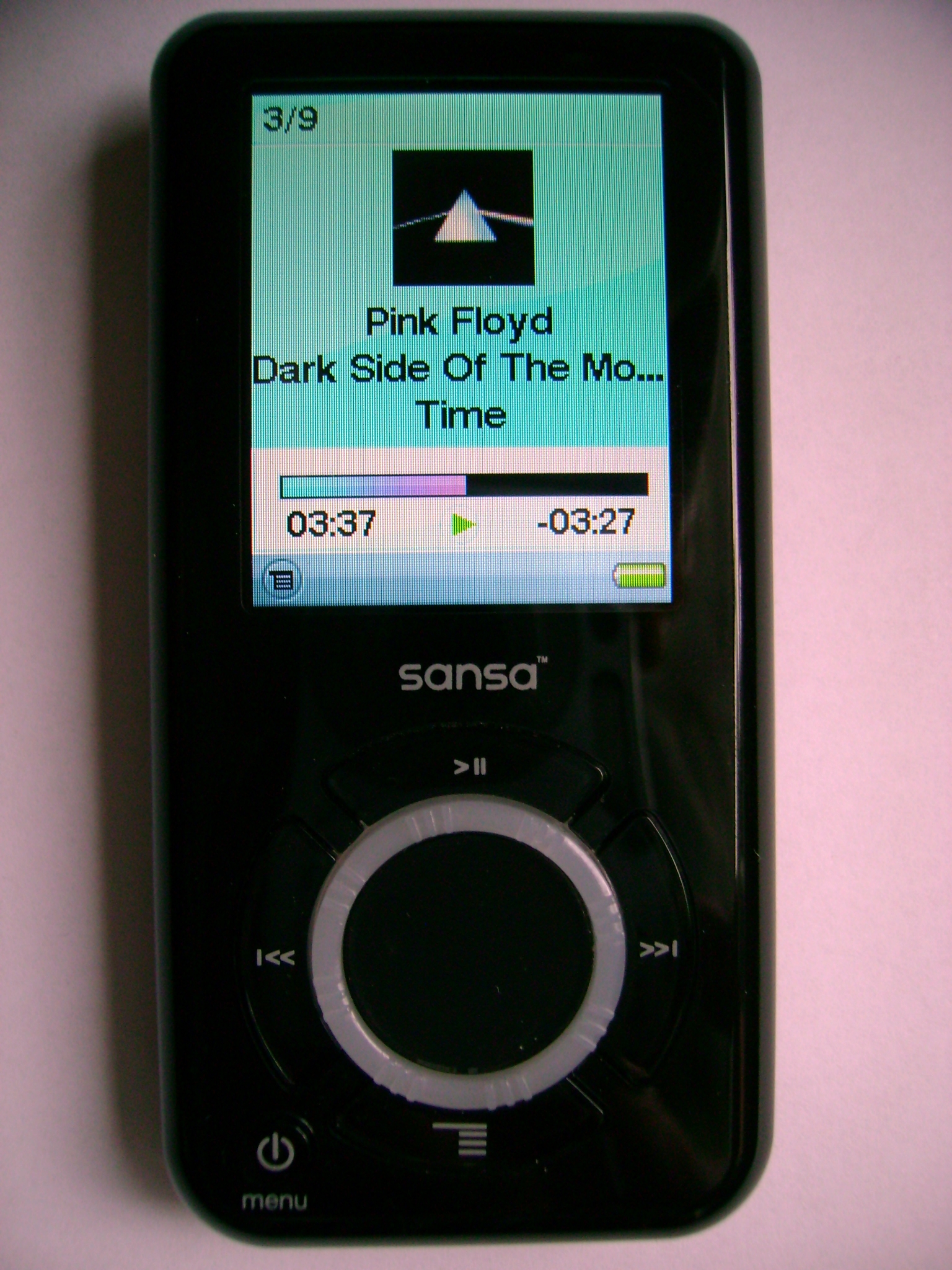
Sansa e200

The Sansa e200 series was released on January 5, 2006. It includes a video player, FM tuner/recorder, voice recorder with built-in microphone, and picture viewer. The players were available in capacities of 2 GB (e250), 4 GB (e260), 6 GB (e270), and 8 GB (e280). There is also a microSD slot for up to 2 GB of memory expansion. (Larger capacity microSDHC cards up to 32 GB are not supported by the original version 1 firmware, but can be used with alternative Rockbox firmware or on version 2 models.)

The Sansa e200R was released in October 2006. Physically identical to the regular e200, it was sold exclusively at Best Buy or directly through Rhapsody. The player has a feature called Rhapsody Channels, which is the online service's brand of podcasting, and also comes with preloaded content. The Rhapsody firmware also added support for AAC audio files. A regular e200 could be flashed into an e200R and back again.

=== Sansa TakeTV ===
Released on October 26, 2007, the Sansa TakeTV is a plug-and-play storage device that allows the playback of DivX, Xvid, and MP4 files on an external display via the included dock and remote. Unlike other Sansa products, the TakeTV is not a digital audio player. The device comes in 4 and 8 GB sizes. While the user is free to play their own videos, the TakeTV came with FanFare, a program similar to iTunes that allowed the user to purchase premium content. On December 11, NBCUniversal partnered with SanDisk to provide content on FanFare after having left Apple in a similar deal. The TakeTV and FanFare were discontinued on May 15, 2008.

=== Sansa View ===
The original Sansa View was SanDisk's attempt at a portable media player, with a 4-inch screen, built-in speaker and an expansion slot for SDHC and SD cards. It was announced on the 2007 Consumer Electronics Show. On June 1, 2007, SanDisk announced that the player had been shelved. It had a redesign, and was launched on October 2007.

=== Sansa Connect ===
The Sansa Connect is a Wi-Fi-enabled player that allows the user to connect to any open network in the area. The Mono/Linux-based device has a 2.2-inch TFT LCD screen, but unlike SanDisk's previous player, the e200 series, the Sansa Connect does not have the ability to connect via USB mass storage or tune to FM radio. The player was developed by ZING Systems in collaboration with SanDisk and Yahoo!, which provides music streaming via LAUNCHcast radio and a subscription download service. Viewing pictures from Flickr is also possible with the device. The Sansa Connect was only available in the United States with a capacity of 4 GB. Storage can be increased with microSD cards, giving the player up to an extra 2 GB of storage. At the 2007 Consumer Electronics Show, the Sansa Connect won the Best of Show award. A firmware update allows the player to support microSDHC cards for a capacity of up to 8 GB and the playback of digital video.

=== Sansa c200 ===
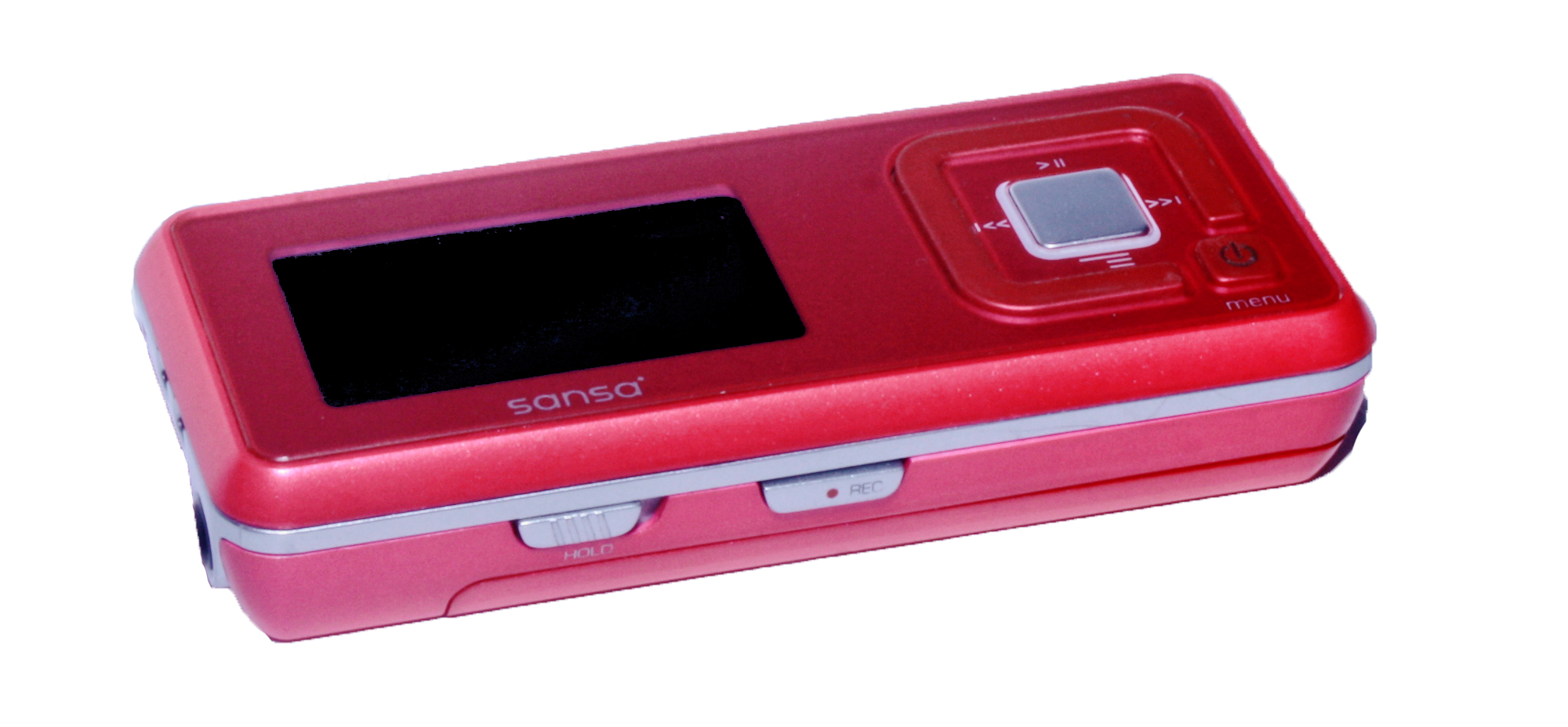
Sansa c200

The Sansa c200 series has a removable, lithium-ion rechargeable battery, FM tuner/recorder, built-in microphone, 1.4-inch 132x80-pixel colour display, and a microSD card slot. The c200 is compatible with many accessories made for the e200. The c200 is available in 1 GB (c240) and 2 GB (c250) capacities. Later models, referred to as v2, have different hardware that adds support for the Audible file format. The packaging of the new models has been updated with the line "Supports Audible audio file formats". The free Rockbox firmware includes a number of additional features, including support for microSDHC (even on v1 c200s) for up to 32 GB of storage.

=== Sansa Express ===
The Sansa Express was sold in capacities of 1 GB and 2 GB. It has a built-in USB connector and a 1.1-inch, duochromatic OLED display, a microSD slot, an FM tuner, a microphone for voice recording, an internal lithium-ion battery, and a lanyard to wear the device around one's neck. It is also able to record FM radio and voice on its internal memory. The Express is not considered a descendant of the c200 series, as it only plays audio. It is more similar to the m200 and maintains much of its design and internal software structure. It is the world's first known flash-based digital audio player that does not require a cable for data transfer, though a USB cable is included in the package if needed.

=== Sansa Shaker ===
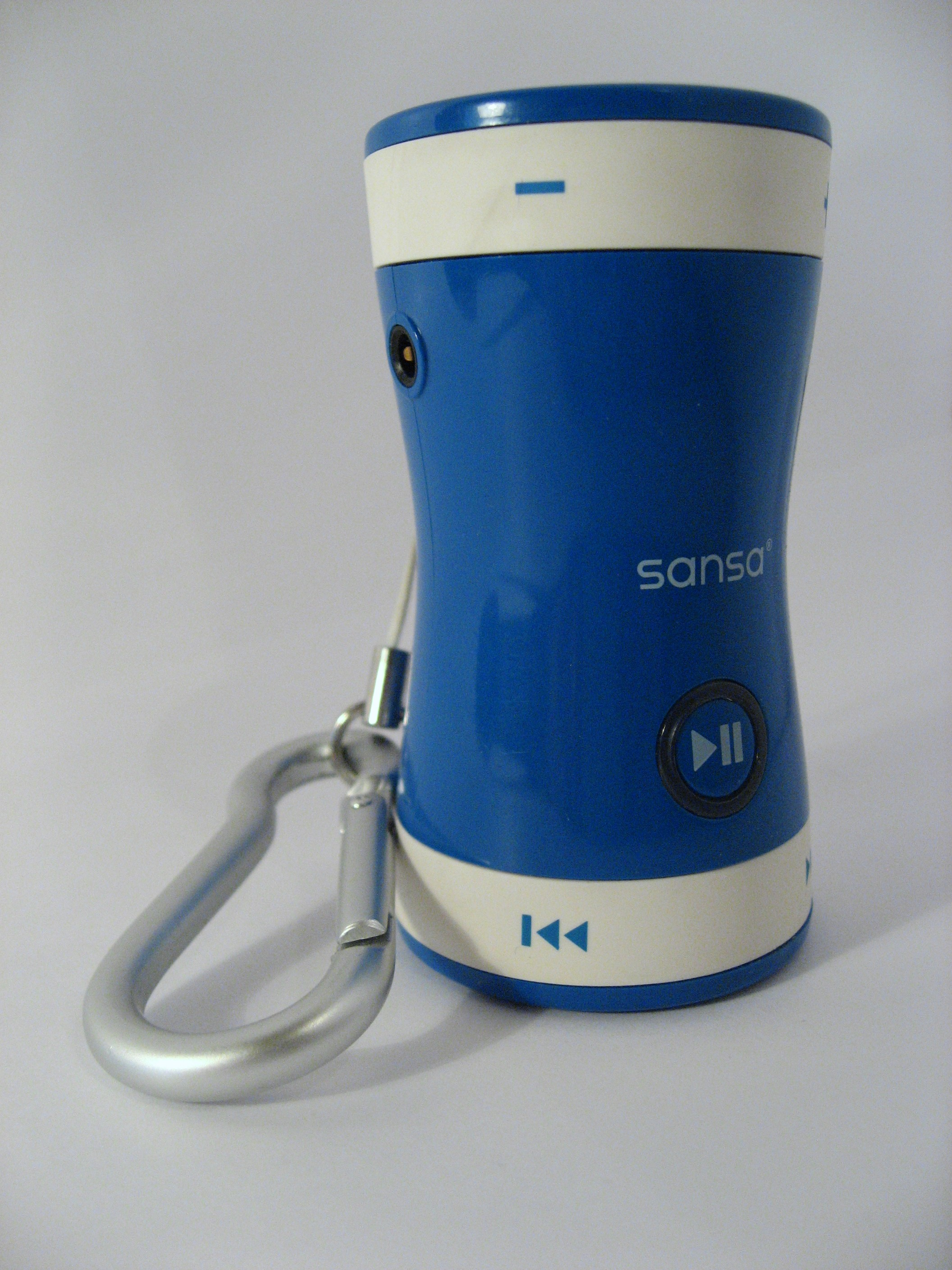
Sansa Shaker

The Sansa Shaker, released in 2007, is a screenless digital audio player with an SD card slot and was sold in blue, red, white, and pink. One 512 MB or 1 GB card is included, and cards up to 4 GB (non-SDHC) can be used. The Shaker's tubular design, resembling that of a salt shaker, is intended to be child-friendly, and it will randomly skip one, two or three songs when shaken. The Shaker plays up to 10 hours of continuous audio with a AAA battery, and has two headphone jacks and a built-in speaker. The upper controller band adjusts volume and the lower controller band skips songs, or fast forwards or rewinds the current song when held. Unlike with other players, the only supported audio file format is MP3. When the memory card is removed during playback, the player emits an "uh-oh" sound. When the player's memory card is put back in, it emits a popping sound.

=== Sansa Clip ===
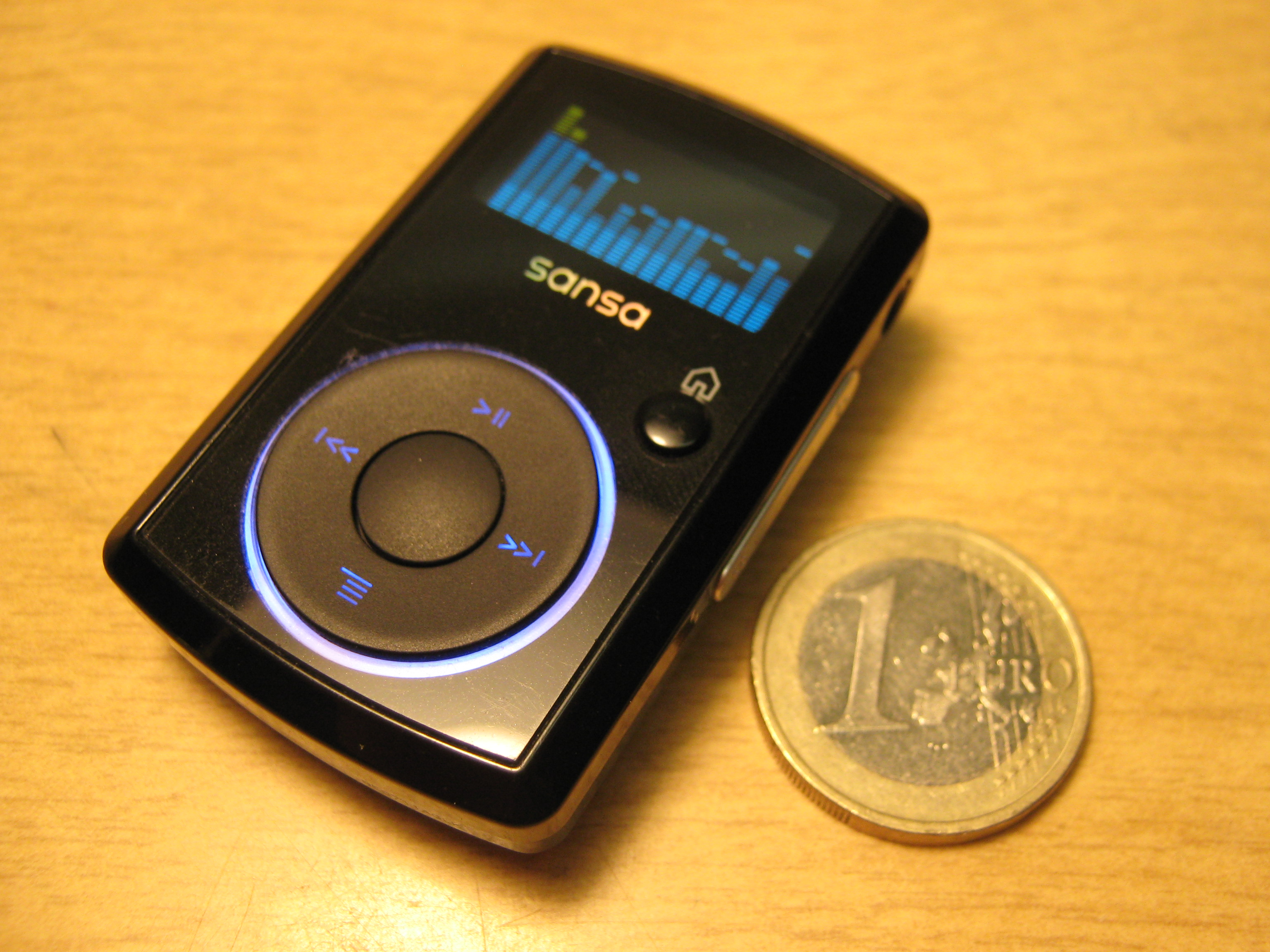
Sansa Clip besides a 1 euro coin

Also known as the m300, the Sansa Clip was released on October 9, 2007. The player is similar in size to the second-generation iPod Shuffle, but incorporates a removable clip and 4-line OLED screen (with one yellow line and three blue lines). The Clip has an FM tuner/recorder and a built-in microphone. The Clip shipped in capacities of 1 GB (available only in black), 2 GB (available in black, blue, red and pink), and 4 GB (silver and black). In November 2008, black and silver 8 GB versions were advertised in the UK.

Midway through production of the Clip, SanDisk updated to a new hardware design, referred to as v2, based on an updated Austriamicrosystems SoC. The updated design moderately improved battery life by introducing a more efficient ARM9E processor in place of the previous ARM9 core. Aside from requiring different firmware upgrades, there were no functional changes to the software. The updated SoC would, however, form the basis for the Clip+ and Clip Zip products. Additionally, the v2 hardware has significantly improved battery life when using the Rockbox firmware (see below) due to dynamic frequency and voltage scaling.

Firmware version 01.01.29, released in May 2008, enabled Ogg Vorbis compatibility for the Sansa Clip. The 01.01.30 firmware update improved OGG support and added FLAC support. The latest firmware packages for the Sansa Clip are 01.01.35 and 02.01.35, which depend on the hardware revision. The official firmware cannot play Ogg Opus files, but support for the opus audio codec is available in Rockbox, a third-party firmware replacement. Rockbox was first released for the Clip v1 on November 21, 2009, and then for the Clip v2 on May 14, 2010.

The device (firmware 01.32+) has five folders: Audible (for Audible content), Audiobooks (for audiobooks that can be "bookmarked" with a resume playback feature), Music, Podcasts (which also support the resume playback feature), and Record (for WAV recordings using the device).

=== Sansa Fuze ===
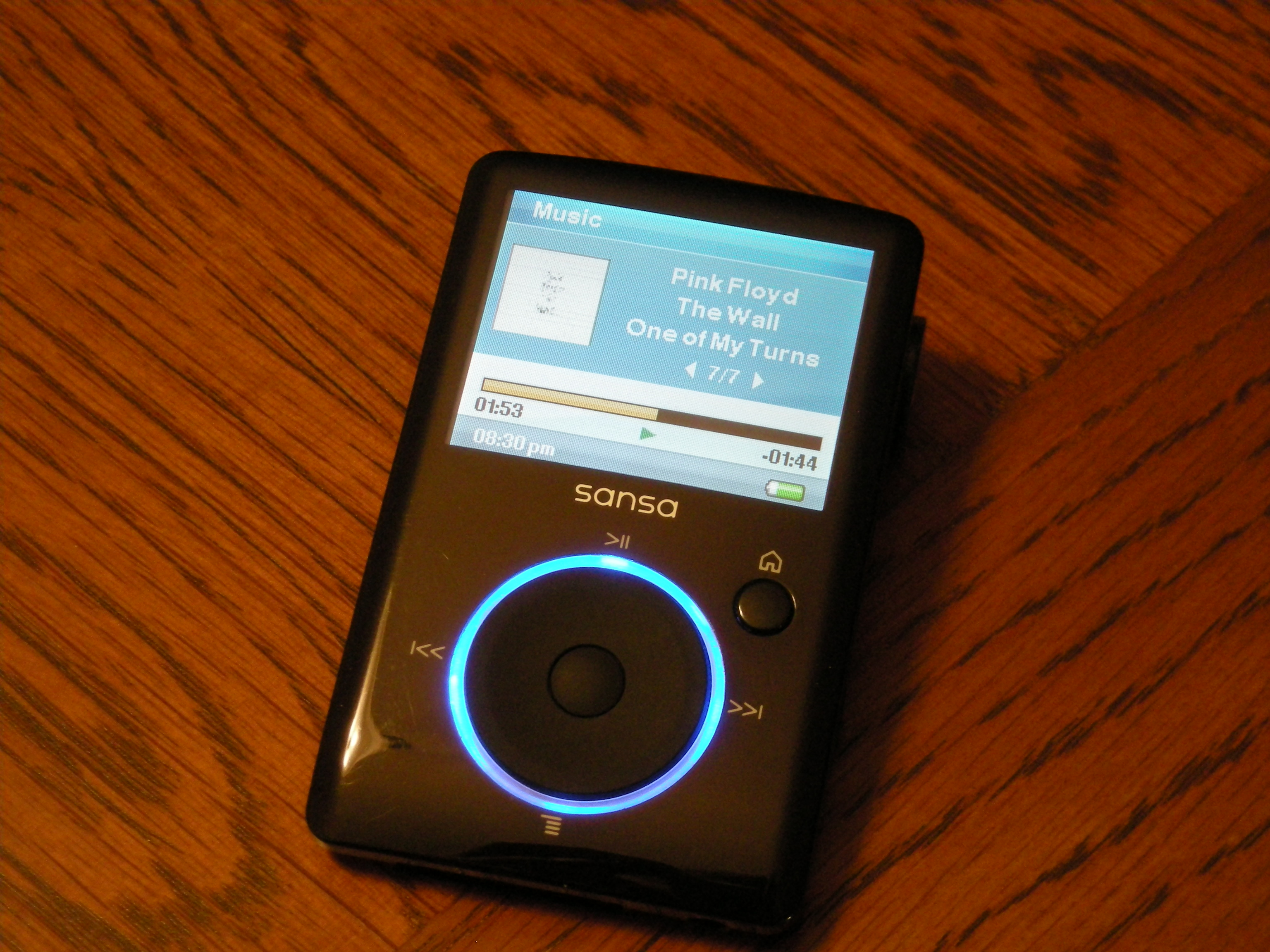
Sansa Fuze (2008, top)

The Sansa Fuze, released on March 28, 2008 in capacities of 2, 4 and 8 GB, is a portable media player with a 1.9-inch color display and a thickness of 0.3 inches (8 mm). It also features a 40-preset FM radio with FM recording, a voice recorder, and a 24-hour battery life on continuous audio playback. Storage is expandable via a microSDHC slot. Firmware version 1.01.22 enables FLAC and Ogg Vorbis playback. Like the Clip, the Fuze underwent two hardware revisions, the first based on the AS3525 (like the first Clip) and the second based on the AS3525+ (like the Clipv2, Clip+ and Clip Zip). The latest firmware releases, depending on hardware version, are 01.02.31, 02.03.31 and 02.03.33.

=== Sansa Clip+ ===
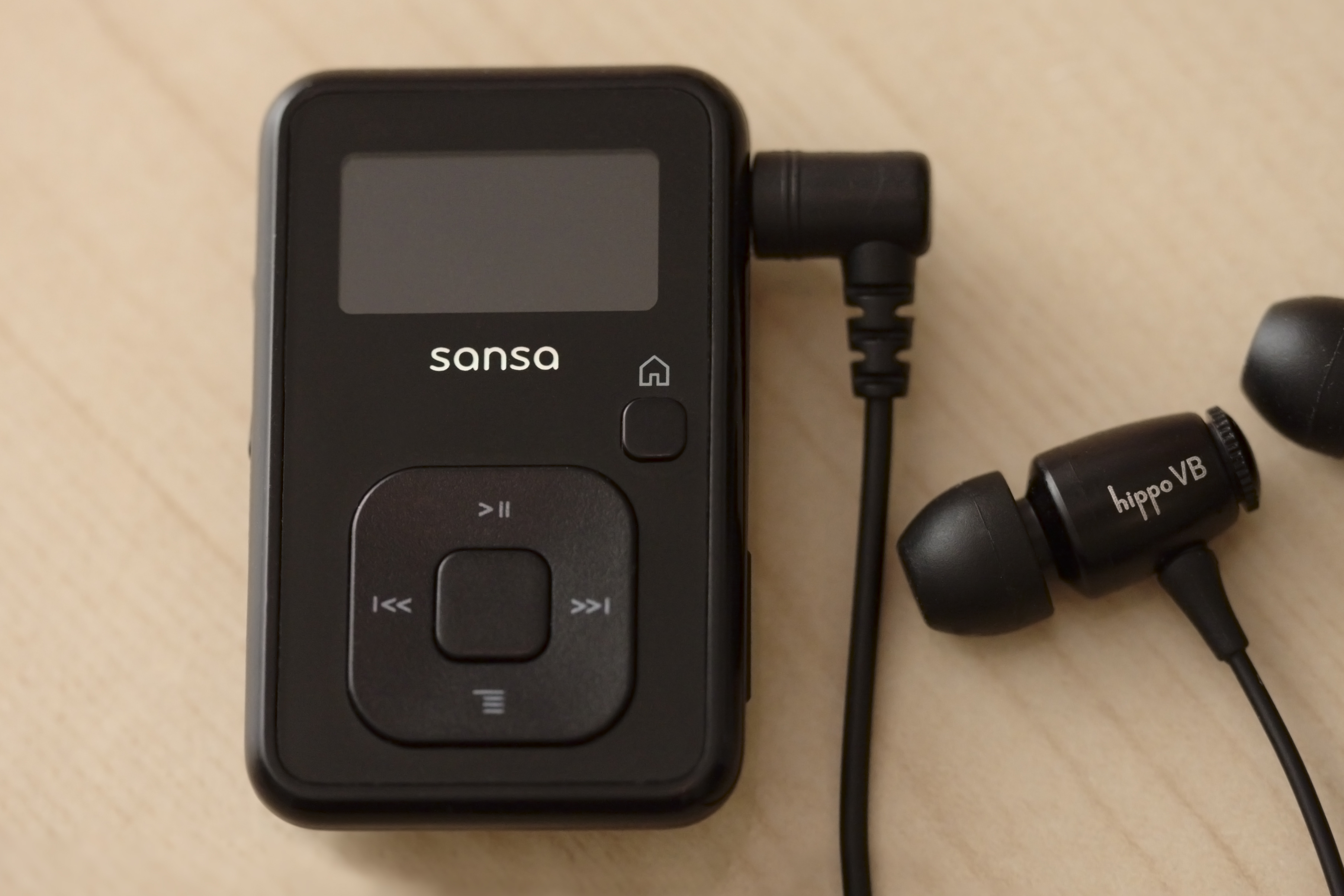
Sansa Clip+ with in-ear monitors

On August 31, 2009, SanDisk released a redesign of the Sansa Clip called the Clip+, cosmetically similar to the Clip and maintaining its basic design, audio hardware, compatibility, and 4-line OLED screen, but with a few significant differences.

There are 2 GB (black), 4 GB (black, red, blue, white or indigo) and 8 GB (black) models. The case has been redesigned to look more square (including the navigation pad, which is also no longer backlit) and is constructed of higher-quality plastic, the clip is no longer removable, and the player now supports folder browsing and ReplayGain support. Transition times between tracks were reduced, but SanDisk officially declined to support gapless playback. A microSDHC card slot has been added, allowing the storage capacity of the device to be expanded by up to an additional 32 GB. The Clip+ also has added features when playing slotMusic and slotRadio. To make room for the microSDHC slot, there have been some changes from the old Clip, including moving the volume switch to the left side of the device and changing the power/hold switch to a simple power button. Hold mode is now activated by holding the "Home" button on the device. Like previous Clip and Fuze products, the Clip+ retained a directly coupled headphone amplifier, allowing for highly accurate reproduction of bass frequencies and very low distortion on difficult-to-drive headphones.

The Sansa Clip+ proved popular with audio enthusiasts and programmers because of its very low cost, excellent DAC, and relatively mature Rockbox port, the latter of which substantially improved battery life and added features such as parametric EQ, completely gapless playback and AAC audio playback. The Clip+ replaced the discontinued original Clip, with which it shared nearly identical hardware aside from the microSDHC slot.

The Clip+ User Manual provides instructions for copying music files and folders from a PC onto internal and external memory. It also provides instructions for creating playlists using Windows Media Player. However, varying degrees of success have motivated many users to experiment with other applications, such as MediaMonkey and Winamp. Almost unique among MP3 players, the Clip + is able to hide empty folders, which is advantageous to podcast listeners, a capability not present in later Sandisk models. For this, and other reasons, used Clip+ players command premium prices on online marketplaces such as eBay.

=== Sansa Fuze+ ===
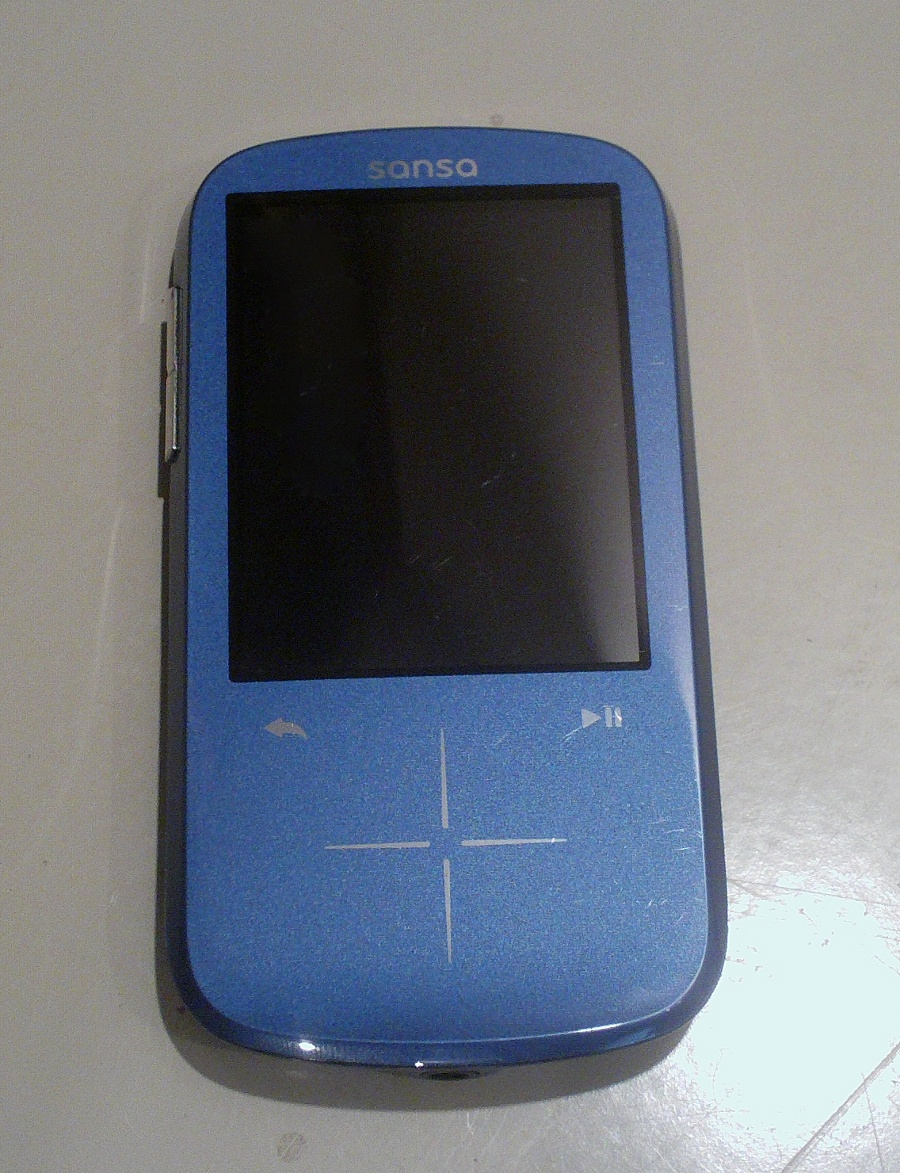
Sansa Fuze+

The Sansa Fuze+, announced on August 31, 2010 in capacities of 4 GB (US$79), 8 GB (US$89) & 16 GB (US$119), is a portable media player with a 2.4 inch QVGA color display and touchscreen capability. It also features an FM radio with FM recording and RDS capability, a voice recorder, and 24 hours of audio playback from a single charge. It supports the following audio formats: MP3, WMA, Secure WMA, Ogg Vorbis, FLAC, AAC, and Audible files. For video, it supports MPEG-4, H.264, and WMV. Storage is expandable via a microSDHC slot, which can be used to play SlotMusic and SlotRadio cards.

=== Sansa Clip Zip ===
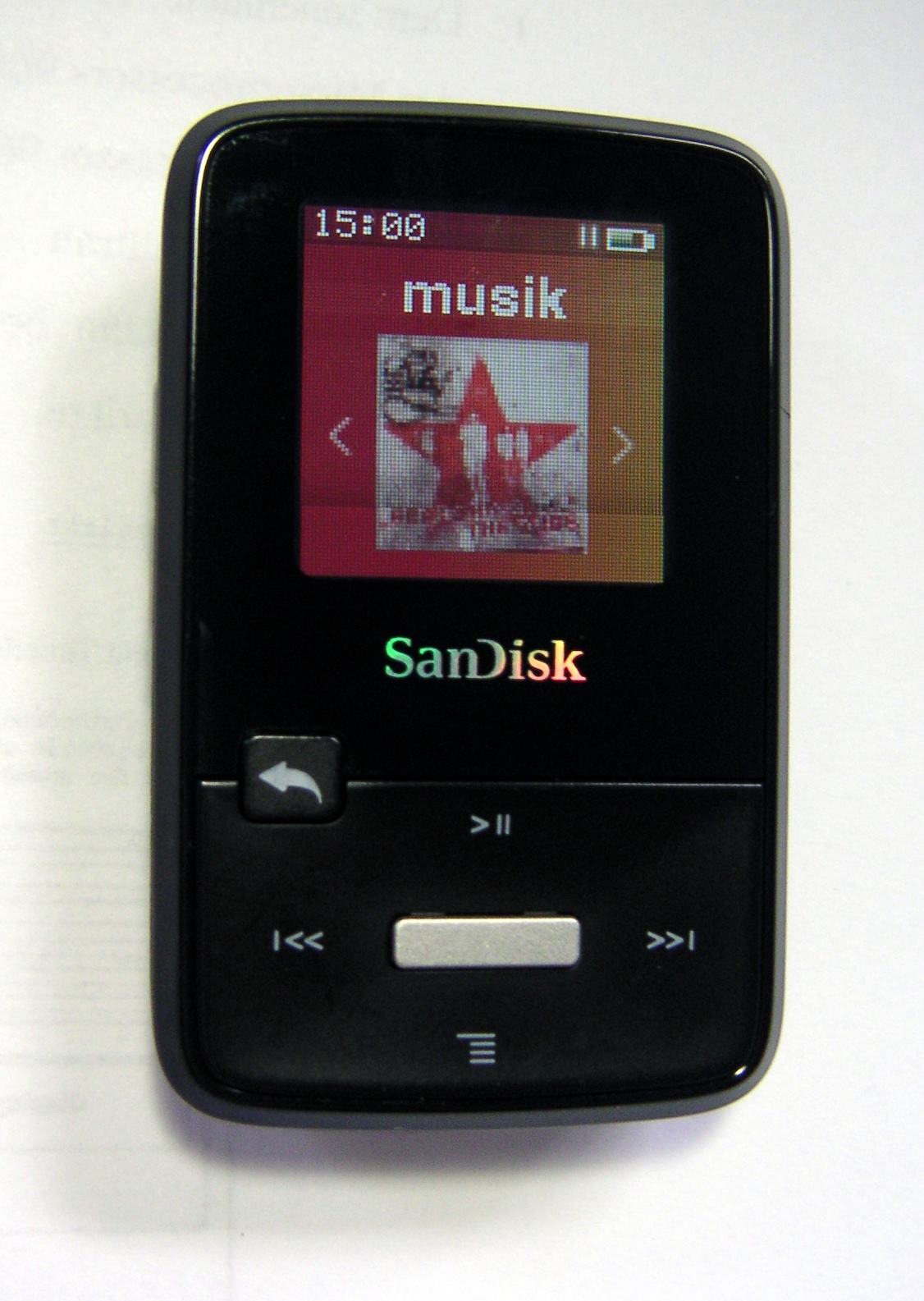
Sansa Clip Zip

On August 24, 2011, SanDisk announced the Sansa Clip Zip, an update to the Clip+. Two versions are available, a 4 GB model for US$50 and an 8 GB model for US$70. The 4 GB model comes in nine colors (red, blue, black, orange, white, grey, purple, lime and teal), while the 8 GB model is only available in black or grey.

The Clip Zip includes all the features of the Clip+ and is based on the same processor as the Clip+ and Fuze v2 but includes a larger 1.1-inch full-color OLED display with support for album art (but called "LCD" in a press release), redesigned controls, a Micro-USB connector, a new user interface similar to that of the Fuze+, a stopwatch, RDS radio capability and support for DRM-free AAC audio files (such as those purchased from the iTunes Store). The new Clip Zip will be sold alongside the Clip+. Internally the Clip Zip is similar to the Clip+ (apart from the Zip having a color screen), and so retains its high quality DAC and amplifier.

=== SanDisk Clip Sport ===
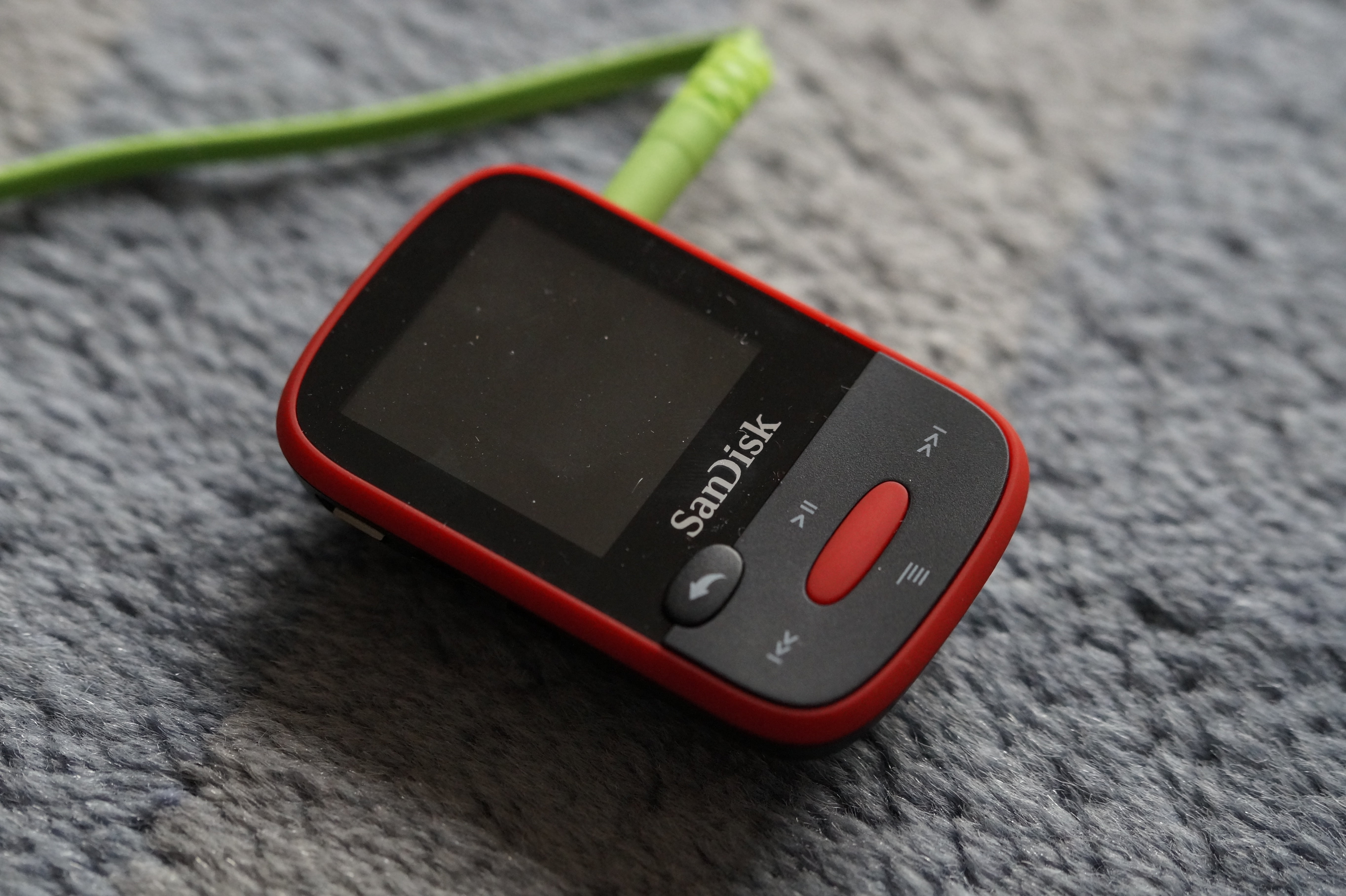
SanDisk Clip Sport (2014)

The Clip Sport was announced on February 10, 2014, with capacities of 4 GB and 8 GB. It is similar to previous Clip models, with a larger screen and longer battery life, but with no voice recorder. Later firmware uses the menu button for locking. A microSDHC card slot is provided to increase storage capacity, but does not support SlotRadio. The Clip Sport is the first SanDisk Audio player to not carry the Sansa name. It was discontinued in late 2018.

=== Clip Jam ===
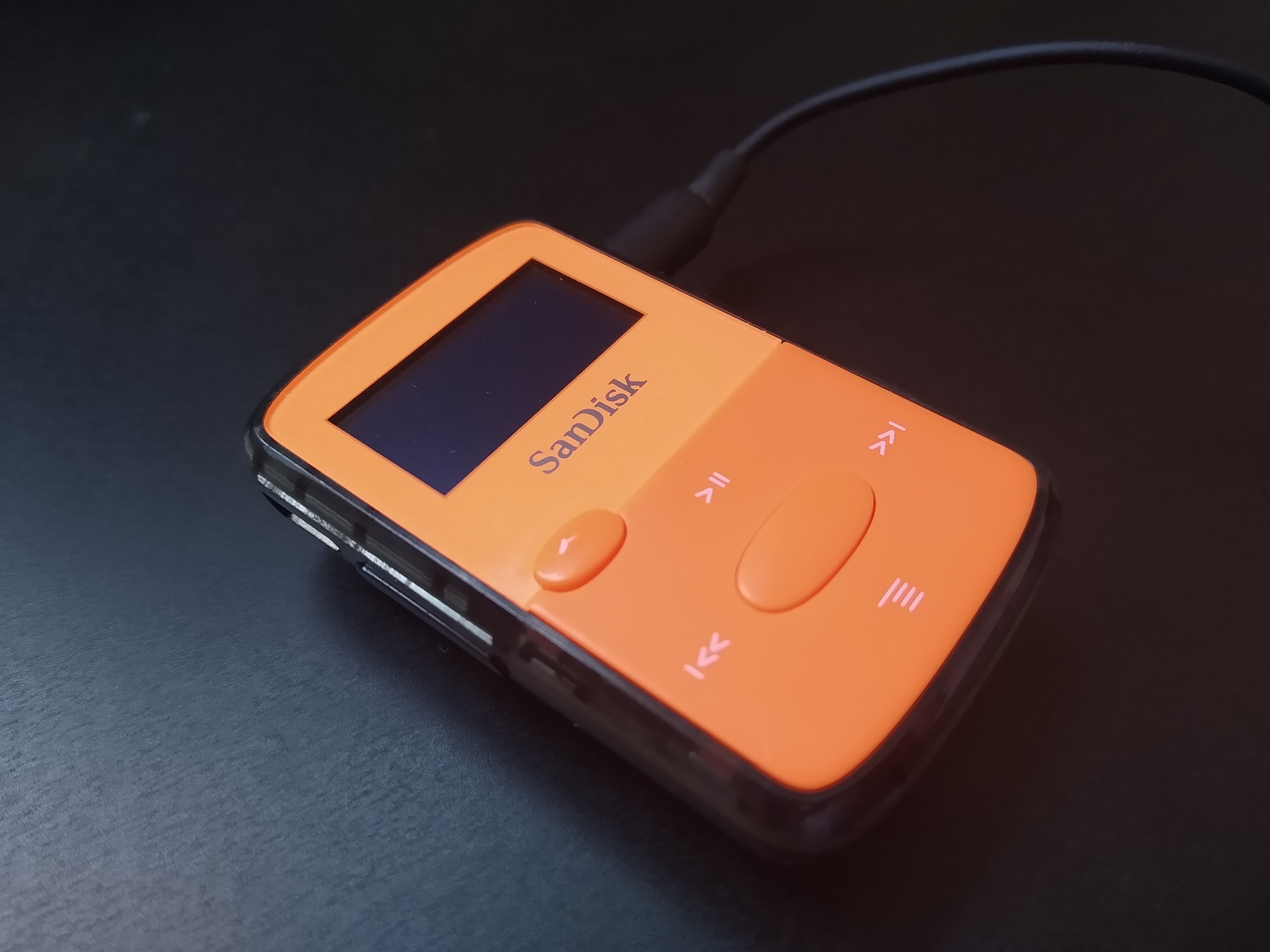
SanDisk Clip Jam

The Clip Jam was released in 2015, replacing the previous Sansa Clip and Clip+ models. It has a microSDHC card slot.

=== Clip Sport Plus ===
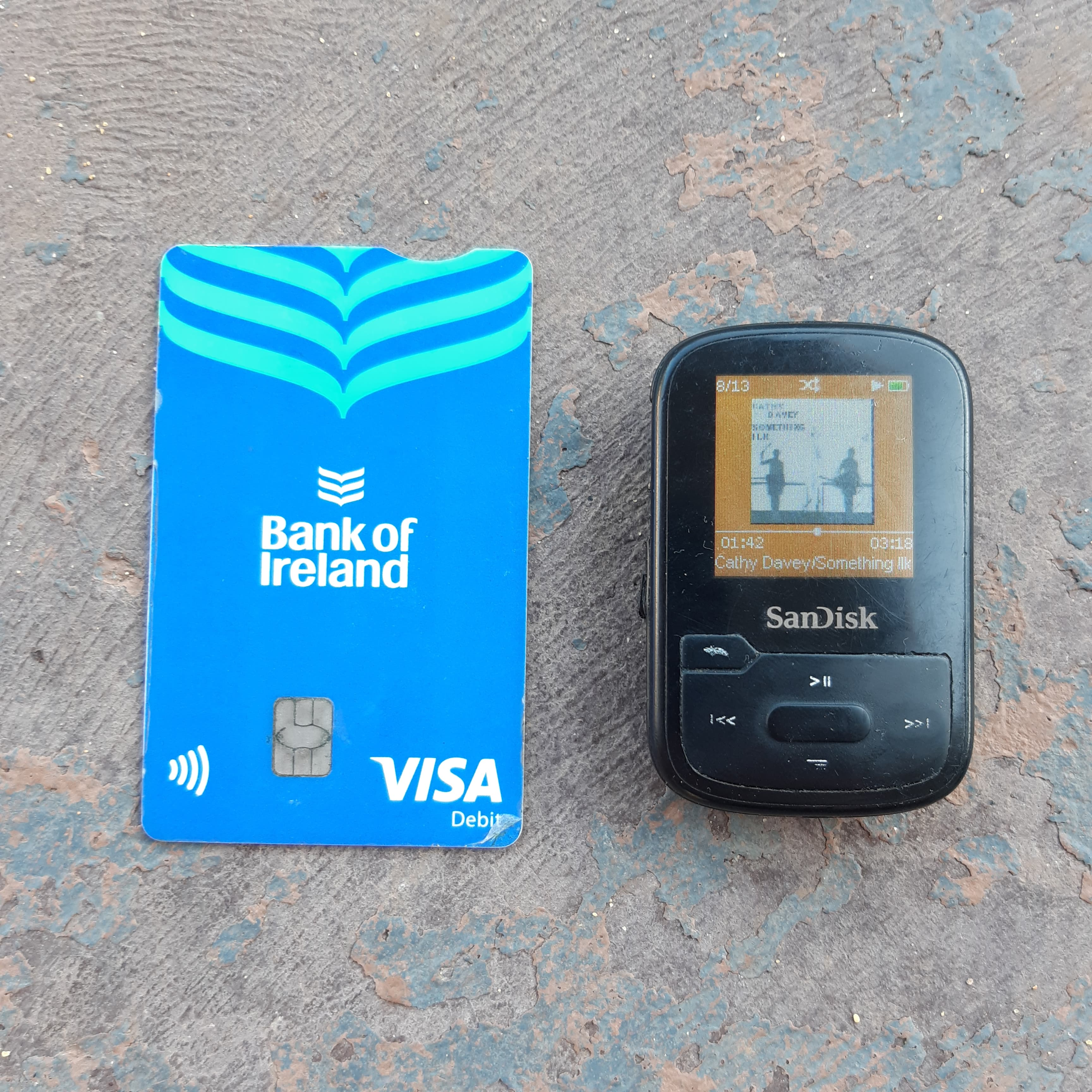
SanDisk Clip Sport Plus (with a bank card for scale)

The Clip Sport Plus was released in 2016, and is the first SanDisk MP3 player to add Bluetooth capabilities and water resistance. It does not have a MicroSD card slot.

=== Clip Sport Go ===
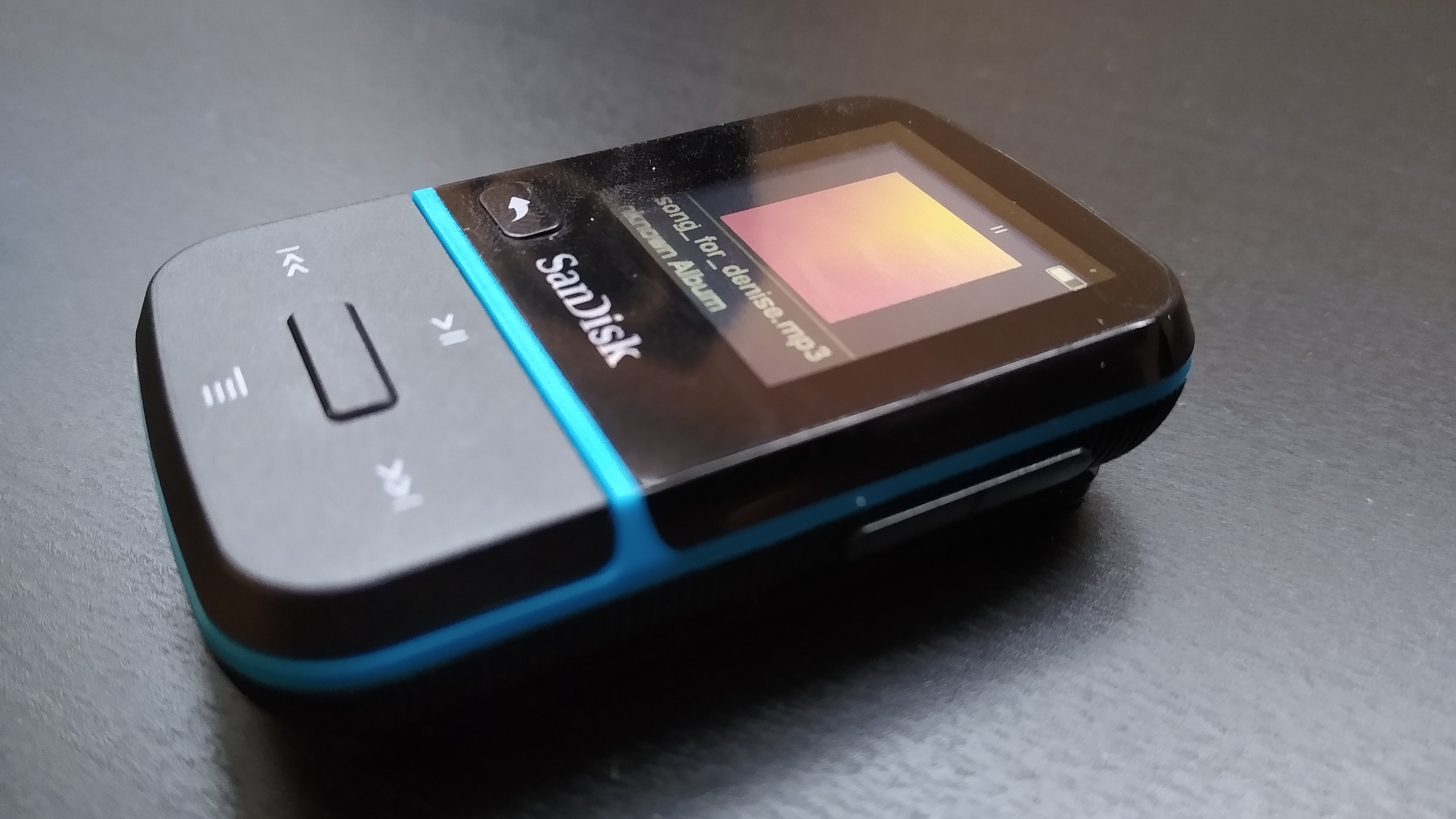
SanDisk Clip Sport Go

The Clip Sport Go was announced in 2018 by SanDisk, and subsequently released on March 2, 2019. It has a built-in microphone for voice recording and lacks a MicroSD card slot.

== Overview and comparison ==
Release year	Player	Processor	Vorbis	FLAC	AAC	ReplayGain	Folder browsing	Rockbox	Firmware version
2019	SanDisk Clip Sport Go	ATJ2167	No	Yes	Yes	Yes	Yes	No	1.04 1.02E
2016	SanDisk Clip Sport Plus	ATJ2127	No	Yes	Yes	Yes	Yes	No	2.20.B01
2015	SanDisk Clip Jam	ATJ2127	Yes	Yes	Yes	Yes	Yes	No	1.16, 0.02E
2014	SanDisk Clip Sport	ATJ2127	Yes	Yes	Yes	Yes	Yes	No	1.43
2011	Sansa Clip Zip	AS3525v2	Yes	Yes	Yes	Yes	Yes	Stable	01.01.21
2010	Sansa Fuze+	i.MX233	Yes	Yes	Yes	Yes	Yes	Stable	02.38.06
2009	Sansa Clip+	AS3525v2	Yes	Yes	No	Yes	Yes	Stable	01.02.18
2009	Sansa Fuze v2	AS3525v2	Yes	Yes	No	Yes	Yes	Stable	02.03.33
2008	Sansa Fuze v1	AS3525	Yes	Yes	No	Yes	Yes	Stable	01.03.33
2008	Sansa Clip v2	AS3525v2	Yes	Yes	No	Yes	No	Stable	02.01.35
2007	Sansa Clip v1	AS3525	Yes	Yes	No	No	No	Stable	01.01.35
2007	Sansa Connect	TMS320	No	No	No	No	No	Unusable	1.2.0.53385
2007	Sansa View	PP6000	No	No	Yes	No	No	Unusable	1.03.02
2007	Sansa Express	STMP 3630	No	No	No	No	No	Unusable	1.01.12
2006	Sansa e200v2	AS3525	No	No	No	No	No	Stable	03.01.16
2006	Sansa e200R	PP5024	No	No	Yes	No	No	Stable	1.0.2.165
2006	Sansa e200v1	PP5024	No	No	No	No	No	Stable	01.02.24
2006	Sansa c200v2	AS3525	No	No	No	No	No	Stable	03.02.05
2006	Sansa c200v1	PP5024	No	No	No	No	No	Stable	01.01.07
2006	Sansa c100	TCC770	No	No	No	No	No	Unusable	2.0.008
2005	Sansa m200v4	AS3525	No	No	No	No	No	Unusable	4.1.08
2005	Sansa m200v123	TCC770	No	No	No	No	No	Unusable	1.3.0 / 2.2.5 / 3.2.8
2005	Sansa e100		No	No	No	No	No	No	

This table refers to the latest version of the SanDisk firmware as of 2019. Earlier versions may have fewer features. Vorbis, FLAC, AAC, ReplayGain, and folder browsing are always included in Rockbox.

== Marketing ==
A poster from the iDon't campaign, comparing iPod users to sheep

In May 2006, SanDisk launched an anti-iPod marketing campaign dubbed "iDon't", featuring graffiti-type posters around urban areas and a website (iDont.com), in an effort to promote the e200 series. SanDisk later replaced the campaign with LilMonsta.com, which is also the name of the creature that resembles the player. In June 2008, LilMonsta.com was shut down in favor of a new website.

On September 3, 2006, SanDisk announced the "Made for Sansa" program, following the similar program by Apple Inc. for its iPod. A number of third-party accessories have been released under it, including hardware accessories mostly for the proprietary 30-pin I/O port featured on the e200, c200, Connect, View, and Fuze players. Japanese pop artist Maki Goto endorsed the Sansa e200 series with a promotional video featuring one of her songs.

== See also ==
- SanDisk
- Rockbox
