= T10 =

T10 may refer to:

== Aircraft ==
- AmeriPlanes Mitchell Wing T-10, an American ultralight aircraft
- Auster T.10, a British observation aircraft
- Carmier Dupoy T.10, a French sport plane
- Sukhoi T-10, a Soviet prototype jet fighter

== Anatomy ==
- Tenth thoracic vertebra
- Thoracic spinal nerve 10

== Automobiles ==
- Suzuki T10, a motorcycle
- Toyota Corona (T10), a sedan
- Triumph T10, a scooter

== Rail and transit ==
=== Lines ===
- Île-de-France tramway Line 10, France
- Line 10, part of the Blue Line (Stockholm Metro), in Sweden

=== Rolling stock ===
- Prussian T 10, a Prussian steam locomotive
- T-10, a former Federal Railroad Administration track geometry car based on the Budd SPV-2000

=== Stations ===
- Bus Center-Mae Station, Sapporo, Hokkaido, Japan
- Higashiyama Station (Kyoto), Japan
- Hiketa Station, Higashikagawa, Kagawa Prefecture, Japan
- Nihombashi Station, Tokyo, Japan
- Tsurumai Station, Nagoya, Aichi Prefecture, Japan

== Sports ==
- Abu Dhabi T10, a 10-over cricket league
- T10 cricket, a 90-minute format of cricket

== Other uses ==
- T10 (satellite)
- Estonian national road 10
- T10 road (Tanzania)
- German torpedo boat T10
- Samsung T10, a portable media player
- Soyuz T-10, a crewed Soyuz mission
- T-10 bomb, an American earthquake bomb
- T-10 parachute, used by the United States Army
- T-10 tank, a Soviet heavy tank
- Toogee language
- T10, on the TORRO scale of tornado intensity
- T10, a fluorescent-lamp format
