= Samsung Yepp U series =

Series of MP3 players

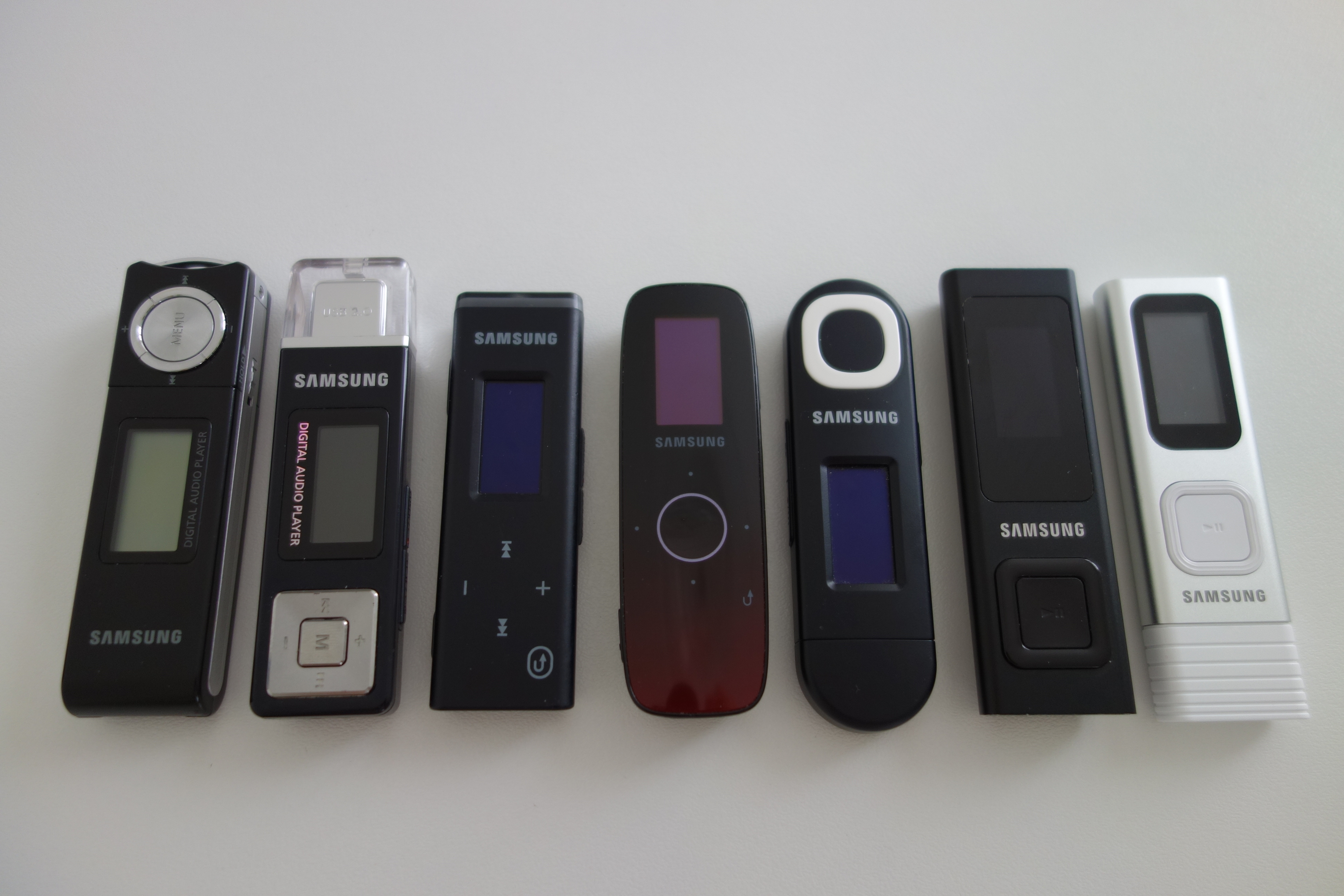

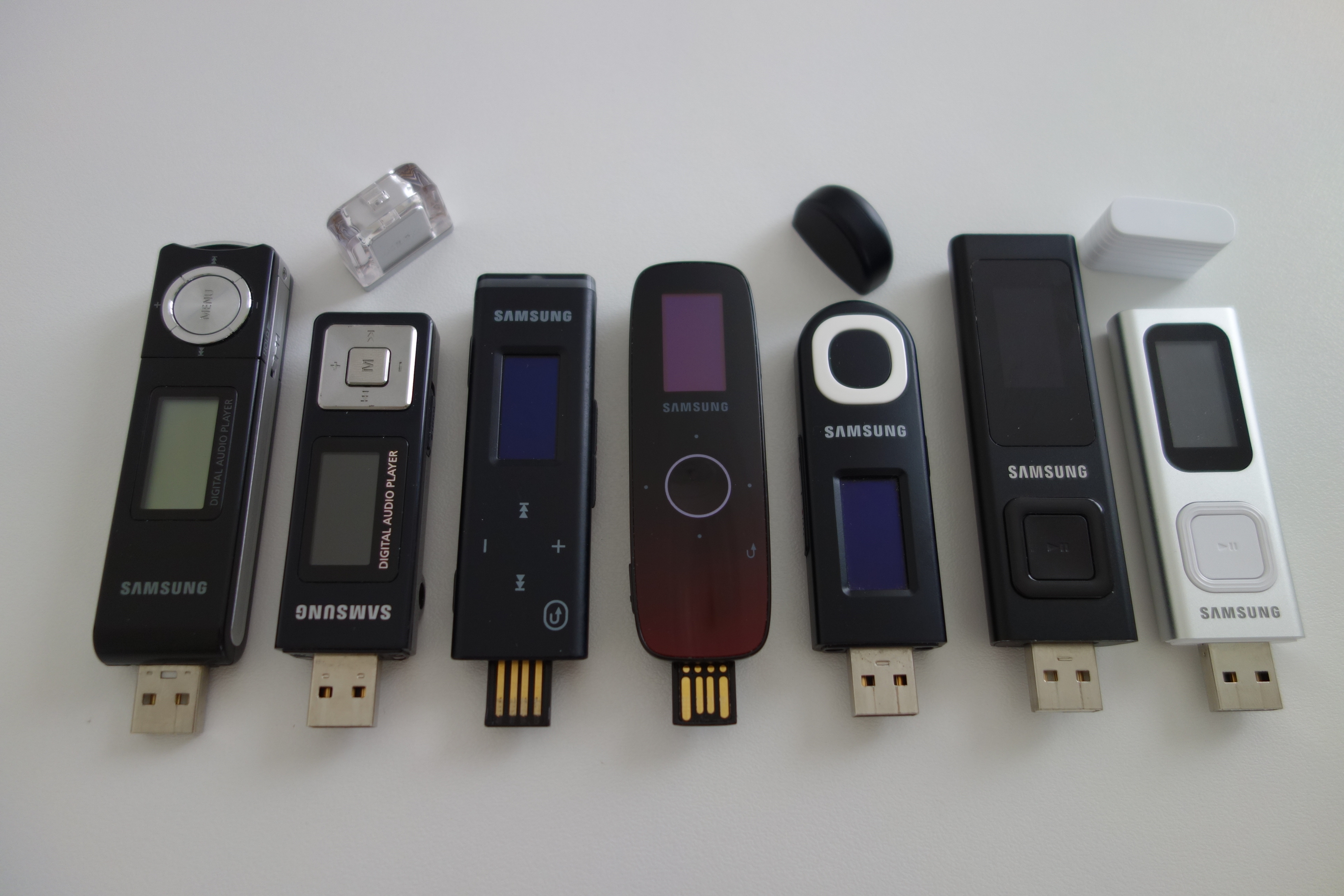
A Samsung Yepp U series collection. From left to right: YP-U1, YP-U2R, YP-U3, YP-U4, YP-U5, YP-U6 and YP-U7

The Samsung Yepp U series is a line of USB key MP3 players made by Samsung and introduced in 2005 with the YP-U1. Samsung used to release a new device every year. Only the YP-U7 was released two years after the U6. It is the largest (7 models) and most durable (7 years) Yepp series. The most famous competitor is the Sony Walkman B series. In South Korea, the iRiver T series is also a main competitor.

All U players have a similar USB key form factor with a 1" 128x64 screen. They all support MP3, WMA and OGG files but some devices support more codecs. The U series is sometimes reproached with not being available in greater capacities than 4 GB and not having expandable storage unlike the famous Sansa Clip series.

== Specifications ==
| Model | Release | Color | Capacity | Dimensions | Weight | Display | SoC | Battery capacity | Battery life | Controls | USB connector | Sound Engine | MP3 | WMA | WAV | OGG | FLAC | AAC | FM tuner | RDS | FM Recording | Voice Recording | Fitness feature | Connection | Latest firmware |
|---|---|---|---|---|---|---|---|---|---|---|---|---|---|---|---|---|---|---|---|---|---|---|---|---|---|
| YP-U1 | 2005 | Black, White | 256, 512MB, 1, 2 GB | 24 mm (0.94 in) H 86 mm (3.4 in) W 13.2 mm (0.52 in) D | 34 g (1.2 oz) | 1" white FSTN LCD 128x64 | Sigmatel STMP3550 | 280mAh | 13 hrs | Tactiles buttons | full size, rotating | SRS WOW | Yes | Yes | Yes | Yes | No | No | No | No | No | Yes | No | UMS | v3.150 KR, v3.152 EU/US |
| YP-U2(R) | 2006 | Black, White | 512 MB, 1, 2 GB | 24.4 mm (0.96 in) H 87.5 mm (3.44 in) W 12.6 mm (0.50 in) D | 28 g (0.99 oz) | 1" negative FSTN LCD 128x64 | Sigmatel STMP3550 | 280mAh | 13 hrs | Tactiles buttons | full size, cap | DNSe 3D | Yes | Yes | Yes | Yes | No | No | Yes | Yes | No | Yes | No | MTP/UMS | 2.212 EU, 2.168 RDS EU, 1.156 US, 2.160 KR |
| YP-U3 | 2007 | Black, White, Pink, Green, Blue | 1, 2, 4 GB | 25.4 mm (1.00 in) H 80 mm (3.1 in) W 11 mm (0.43 in) D | 22.8 g (0.80 oz) | 1" blue OLED 128x64 | Samsung S5L8424 | 250mAh | 15 hrs | Touchpad | small size, slider | DNSe 3D | Yes | Yes | No | Yes | No | No | Yes | Yes | No | Yes | No | MTP/UMS | v1.12 KR/WA, v1.13 EU/US |
| YP-U4 | 2008 | Blue, Red, Purple | 2, 4 GB | 27 mm (1.1 in) H 83 mm (3.3 in) W 13 mm (0.51 in) D | 27.5 g (0.97 oz) | 1" 16-grey OLED 128x64 | Sigmatel STMP3650 | 300mAh | 16 hrs | Touchpad | small size, slider | DNSe 2.0 | Yes | Yes | No | Yes | No | No | Yes | Yes | Yes | Yes | No | MTP/UMS | v1.34 |
| YP-U5 | 2009 | Black, Blue, White, Red, Pink | 2, 4 GB | 25 mm (0.98 in) H 88 mm (3.5 in) W 11.8 mm (0.46 in) D | 23 g (0.81 oz) | 1" 16-grey OLED 128x64 | Sigmatel STMP3770 | 160mAh | 20 hrs | Tactile buttons | full size, cap | DNSe 3.0 Core | Yes | Yes | Yes | Yes | Yes | Yes | Yes | Yes | Yes | Yes | Yes | MTP/UMS | v1.57 |
| YP-U6 | 2010 | Black, Pink | 2, 4 GB | 26.9 mm (1.06 in) H 86.2 mm (3.39 in) W 12.3 mm (0.48 in) D | 34 g (1.2 oz) | 1" color CSTN LCD 128x64 | Sigmatel STMP3770 | 165mAh | 20 hrs | Tactile buttons | full size, slider | SoundAlive | Yes | Yes | Yes | Yes | Yes | No | Yes | Yes | Yes | Yes | Yes | MTP/UMS | v1.10 |
| YP-U7 | 2012 | Black, Silver, Pink | 4 GB | 26 mm (1.0 in) H 85.9 mm (3.38 in) W 9.72 mm (0.383 in) D | 28.4 g (1.00 oz) | 1" color TFT LCD 128x64 | AIT508 | 120mAh | 20 hrs | Tactile buttons | full size, cap | SoundAlive | Yes | Yes | No | Yes | Yes | No | Yes | No | No | No | Yes | UMS | v1.04 |

== YP-U1 ==
The YP-U1 was first announced in August 2005 then released in October 2005 in Asia and Europe and early November 2005 in the US. It first came in 3 capacities (256 MB, 512 MB and 1 GB) and 2 colors (black and white). A 2 GB version was later released early 2006.

It was Samsung's first mp3 player with an integrated USB key. The design was thus completely new but the firmware and the UI are very similar to previous models such as YP-MT6 and YP-C1. It has a 1" white FSTN LCD 128x64 screen. It features a voice recorder but no FM tuner. It uses a non-removable rechargeable battery with a stated runtime of 13 hours. It supports MP3, WMA, WAV, ASF and OGG files.

It features 3 EQ presets and a 9-band user EQ. The player also supports SRS WOW HD sound enhancement but only with the latest Korean firmware v3.150; latest EU and US firmware v3.152 does not include it. However, it is possible to install the Korean firmware on a European or American model. The U1 is the only player from the U series along with the latest U7 to be UMS only in any geographical area.

== YP-U2 ==
The Samsung YP-U2 was first introduced at the CES in January 2006 then released in April 2006 in the US. It comes in 3 capacities (512MB, 1GB, 2 GB) and 2 colors (black and white).

The YP-U2 was released in different versions depending on the geographical area: in Korea the U2 was MSC only, featuring an FM tuner. In the USA the U2 was sold as a MTP device (YP-U2J Janus) with an FM tuner too. In Europe two MSC versions were available: one without FM tuner and another one (YP-U2R) with a RDS FM tuner. Each version has its own firmware.

Overall the U2 is quite similar to its predecessor. The main differences concern the hardware: the USB port is no longer retractable and is covered by a transparent cap, allowing glowing effects with two blue LEDs. Also, it now has a negative screen (white font and black background). There is no major change in the firmware except the presence of the new DNSe sound engine, first introduced a few months ago on the YP-T7F.

== YP-U3 ==
The YP-U3 was first spotted end of March 2007, then officially announced in May 2007 by Samsung Japan and released in June/July in Asia and Europe. It was also released later in the USA. It comes in 3 capacities (1, 2 and 4 GB) and 5 colors (Black, White, Blue, Green, Pink). Contrary to its predecessor, the U3 has touch controls (which was often criticized in reviews), a new blue OLED screen and a half-size sliding USB connector. The "now playing" screen and the DNSe effects are the same as on the U2 but the main menu is much different. It has a blue LED flashing randomly or when pressing a button.

Devices sold in Europe and the USA (YP-U3J Janus) are MTP and have a tags library. Moreover, the European models have the RDS feature. Devices sold in Asia and the rest of the world are MSC and have a file browser instead of the tags library. It is unofficially possible to install a MSC firmware on a MTP YP-U3 but then the RDS support is lost. The latest MSC firmware is v1.12 and the latest MTP firmware is v1.13.

== YP-U4 ==
The YP-U4 (aka Litmus) was first leaked in June 2008, then officially announced in July and finally released in August 2008 in South Korea in two capacities: 2 GB (69,000 won) and 4 GB (89,000 won). Later it was released in other Asian and European countries but strangely it was decided not to release it on some usual markets like France or the United States. It comes in 3 different colors: red, blue and purple. It supports MP3, WMA and OGG files and features a RDS FM tuner as well as FM and voice recording. In the user manual, the battery life is rated up to 16 hrs with MP3 128 kbit/s files but due to the sleep mode this may be reduced.

It still has touch controls and a similar built-in sliding USB plug as the U3 but the plastic case design is quite different. Also, the OLED screen is no longer blue but displays 16-grey levels. The UI was also reworked compared to the U3: the vertical main menu changed to a horizontal menu, with some redesigned icons. And the "Now playing" screen now displays the album art if one is embedded in the tags. The U4 has three LEDs which can blink randomly or when pressing a button. It also has the standard DNSe 2.0 engine, including street mode, clarity, 3D and Bass effects as well as 10 EQ presets and a 7-band user EQ.

Samsung released 7 firmware versions for this device, from v1.17 on August 26, 2008, to the latest v1.34 released on August 27, 2009. Those are mainly bug fixes. According to the official changelog, firmware v1.32 fixes occasional playback noise but also shortens battery life by about 2 hours. In KR (Korea) region code the U4 is MSC only while in EU (Europe) region code it is MTP by default with a PC connection (MTP or MSC) setting. The U4 is the first of the series to have a region code which may be changed with a config.dat file independently from the firmware file and the first one to allow both tags and files/folders navigation.

The YP-U4 was sometimes reproached with having a too sensitive and not accurate touchpad as well as a laggy UI.

== YP-U5 ==
The YP-U5 was unveiled at the CES in January 2009 then released in April 2009. It is available in 5 colors: Black, Blue, White, Red, Pink and 2 capacities: 2 and 4 GB. A Hello Kitty edition with branded casing and packaging was released later in October 2009.

It features a plastic case and a non-retractable USB port contrary to the previous U3 and U4. The criticized touch buttons of the U4 were replaced by tactile buttons. It also has a RDS FM tuner as well as FM and voice recording.

The UI is almost the same as on the YP-U4 but it is much faster and smoother. The U5 introduces the "Popcon" characters, the fitness feature and the DNSe 3.0 core sound engine. The fitness feature consists of an estimation of burned calories depending on several parameters, including one's weight and the exercise type (walk slow, walk fast, run slow, run fast, hiking, cycle or yoga). There is no physical sensor so the result may be inaccurate. The DNSe 3.0 core is a "light" version of the usual DNSe 3.0 effects first introduced on the YP-Q1. Several features and settings like Clarity, Audio Upscaler, Wise Volume and Level Optimizer are lacking here, making the core version of the DNSe 3.0 worse than the standard version of the DNSe 2.0 embedded in the previous YP-U4 and several other players.

Samsung released 6 firmware versions, from v1.12 to the latest v1.57 released on October 18, 2010 but these are only bugfixes. AAC files are unofficially partly working in firmware v1.12 and older. The support was removed in firmware 1.33 and more recent.

== YP-U6 ==
The Samsung YP-U6 was first introduced at the IFA in September 2010 in Berlin then released early November 2010 in South Korea. It is available in full black or pink and white colors and in two different capacities: 2 and 4 GB (respectively 59,000 and 69,000 won). The U6 is the first of the series to have a color screen (4-line 128x64 CSTN LCD). However the UI is almost exactly the same as on the previous U5. It still displays the album art, now in color. This device also introduced the aluminum anodized casing instead of the usual plastic. The USB port is retractable with a slider like on the U3 and U4 but it now has a full size USB port, which is less fragile.

The DNSe sound engine was replaced by the new SoundAlive engine, first introduced in June 2010 on the YP-RB (only available in Korea). However, only a "light" version of the SoundAlive effects is embedded. Several features and settings present in higher-range Samsung players like Clarity, Audio Upscaler, Wise Volume and Level Optimizer are lacking. In the end, the U6 SoundAlive are close to the U5 DNSe 3.0 Core, only the EQ presets are different.

Samsung released 3 firmware versions for this device: v1.05, v1.09 (November 29, 2010) and v1.10. The latter was released on September 17, 2012, that is to say 2 years after the product release, which is quite unusual. No feature was added or improved, the releases only fixed some bugs, some of them related to the battery charging process.

== YP-U7 ==
The Samsung YP-U7 is the latest device from the U series first released early September 2012 in Russia. The French, Italian and German releases followed in November. Unusual fact, it was released on the Korean home market only months later, in February 2013. The YP-U7 was not released in the USA.

It is the first U player to come only in one memory capacity: 4 GB. Three colors are available: black, silver and pink. Like the YP-U6 it features a 1" color 128x64 screen but with a different technology (TFT LCD instead of CSTN LCD), making it better quality according to the reviews. The sliding USB key of the U6 was replaced by a standard USB port and a plastic cap. As a result, the aluminum case is thinner but there is a risk to lose the cap. The U7 still features the same "now playing" screen as on the U5 and U6 but the main menu is different: the icons rotating like a cube are taken from the Android TouchWiz UI. Compared to its predecessors which have a "user" (=shortcut) button allowing the user to assign only one specific function, the U7 has a "context menu" button like the players from higher-range, allowing the user to change specific settings without being obliged to go through the main menu and the general settings.

The U7 is the first one of the series not to include a voice recorder. Also, models sold in Europe (EU and FR region codes) do not have FM radio in software. Supposedly Samsung made this decision to avoid paying the European tax on FM tuners and therefore sell the device cheaper and/or increase its margin. However, the FM tuner is present in hardware in any U7. Therefore, it is possible to get the feature back on European models by changing the region code from EU/FR to KR. The trick is explained on the web. On the downside, since the FM tuner was not supposed to work in Europe, Samsung did not write the firmware code for RDS display although this feature is supported by the Silabs Si4709 FM tuner.

Like its two predecessors, the U7 has the study mode (repeat A-B and adjustable playback speed to learn foreign languages) and the fitness feature. But it no longer has a MTP setting, it is MSC only. Thus, DRM files are not supported.

Samsung only released two firmware versions for the YP-U7, the v1.01 and the latest v1.04 released on May 3, 2013. The changelog is unclear but they appear to fix only minor issues.
