= YEPP =

YEPP may refer to:

- Youth of the European People's Party
- Samsung YEPP, Samsung's digital audio player
