= Panasonic Lumix DMC-FS5 =

Overview
- Maker: Panasonic
- Released: 2008

Lens
- Lens: 30-120mm equivalent
- F-numbers: f/3.3-f/5.8 at the widest

Sensor/medium
- Sensor type: CCD
- Sensor size: 6.08 x 4.56mm (1/2.33 inch type)
- Maximum resolution: 3648 × 2736 (10 megapixels)
- Recording medium: SD, SDHC or MMC memory card; internal memory

Focusing
- Focus areas: 9 focus points

Flash
- Flash: Xenon

Shutter
- Shutter speeds: 1/2000s to 60s
- Continuous shooting: 2.5 frames per second (full resolution)

Image processing
- White balance: Yes

General
- Video recording: Max. 848×480 (WVGA) at 30fps
- LCD screen: 2.5 inches with 230,000 dots
- Optional battery packs: Yes
- AV Port(s): Composite AV, PictBridge, Mass Storage, Media Transfer Protocol
- Dimensions: 95 x 53 x 23mm (3.74 x 2.1 x 0.89 inches)
- Weight: 159g including battery
- Made in: Taiwan

The Panasonic Lumix DMC-FS5 is a compact digital camera announced by Panasonic on January 29, 2008.

Its exterior, user interface and firmware is nearly identical to that of the Panasonic Lumix DMC-FS3.
