= Samsung YEPP =

Brand of electronic devices

The old logos for Yepp players

Yepp was Samsung Electronics' digital audio player brand until Samsung decided to retire most of their family brands in February 2011. From then on, their MP3 players were simply branded "Samsung" worldwide until they discontinued all of them in late 2013. The brand included a wide range of hard-drive based as well as flash-memory based players. The name is claimed to be an acronym for "young, energetic, passionate person".

== History ==
The Yepp brand was first introduced at CES 1999 in Las Vegas where the first Samsung mp3 players have been unveiled (YP-E, YP-B and YP-D series). Samsung MP3 players were branded "Yepp" worldwide until 2003. From then Samsung only kept this brand for the Korean market while the players sold in the rest of the world were simply branded "Samsung". Samsung finally dropped the Yepp brand in Korea too since 2011. Even though it has disappeared for 10 years in Europe and America, it is still common among the users to refer to the Samsung MP3 players as "Yepp".

As of November 2013, Samsung discontinued their MP3 players line in most countries. Only the YP-W1 and YP-U7 are still available in some countries. The Galaxy Players series has also been discontinued in most countries. Samsung released the successor to the YP-GI1, the YP-GI2 (Galaxy 070) only in Korea in August 2013. Samsung shut down all official MP3 players dedicated websites and blogs in Korea and worldwide.

As of December 2016, Samsung discontinued their MP3 players and Android-based Galaxy Players lines worldwide. Even though Samsung never announced officially they would stop producing MP3 players, it appears they actually did.

== Comparison of models ==
The naming scheme of Samsung players has always been the same. For example, YP-P2JEB, where J stands for Janus (MTP models, no letter if UMS), E stands for 16 GB (V:256 MB; X:512 MB; Z:1 GB; Q:2 GB; A:4 GB; C:8 GB; E:16 GB; N:32 GB) and B stands for Black (W:White; P:Pink; S:Silver etc.). On some models, an R indicates RDS support (for example: YP-F2R) or an F indicates an FM tuner (example: YP-Z5F); however, some models with the feature do not have the suffix.

Some Samsung MP3 players, including YH-820/920/925, YP-R0, YP-R1, and YP-Z5 are partly or fully supported by Rockbox.

=== Discontinued models ===
| Model | Release | Color | Capacity | Display | Controls | Sound Engine | MP3 | WMA | WAV | OGG | FLAC | AAC | Divx | Xvid | MPEG4 | H.264 | WMV | Other formats | FM tuner | RDS | Voice Recording | MicroSD slot | Bluetooth | Games | Speaker | Connection |
|---|---|---|---|---|---|---|---|---|---|---|---|---|---|---|---|---|---|---|---|---|---|---|---|---|---|---|
| YP-CP3 | 2009 | Black | 4, 8 GB | 3" color TFT LCD 400x240 | Tactile buttons | DNSe 2.0 | Yes | Yes | Yes | Yes | Yes | No | Yes | Yes | Yes | No | Yes | RM/RMVB, JPG, BMP, PNG, GIF, TXT | Yes | No | Yes | Yes | No | No | No | UMS |
| YP-F3 | 2011 | Black, Blue, Pink | 2, 4 GB | 1" color CSTN LCD 128x64 | Tactile buttons | SoundAlive | Yes | Yes | No | Yes | Yes | No | No | No | No | No | No | - | Yes | No | No | No | No | No | No | UMS |
| YP-M1 | 2009 | Black | 8, 16, 32 GB | 3.3" color AMOLED 272x480 | Touch screen | DNSe 3.0 | Yes | Yes | Yes | Yes | Yes | Yes | Yes | Yes | Yes | Yes | Yes | JPG, BMP, PNG, GIF, TXT | Yes | Yes | Yes | Yes | Yes (2.1+EDR) | Yes | Yes | MTP/UMS |
| YP-P2 | 2007 | Black, White, Red | 4, 8, 16 GB | 3" color TFT LCD 272x480 | Touch screen | DNSe 2.0 | Yes | Yes | No | Yes | No | No | No | No | Yes | Yes | Yes | JPG, TXT | Yes | Yes | Yes | No | Yes (2.0) | Yes | No | MTP/UMS |
| YP-P3 | 2009 | Black, Silver | 4, 8, 16, 32 GB | 3" color TFT LCD 272x480 | Touch screen | DNSe 3.0 | Yes | Yes | No | Yes | Yes | Yes | Yes | Yes | Yes | Yes | Yes | JPG, BMP, PNG, GIF, TXT | Yes | Yes | Yes | No | Yes (2.1+EDR) | Yes | Yes | MTP/UMS |
| YP-Q1 | 2008 | Black, Silver, White | 4, 8, 16 GB | 2.4" color TFT LCD 240x320 | Touchpad | DNSe 3.0 | Yes | Yes | No | Yes | Yes | No | No | Yes | Yes | No | Yes | JPG, BMP, PNG, GIF, TXT | Yes | Yes | Yes | No | No | Yes | No | MTP/UMS |
| YP-Q2 | 2009 | Black, White, Blue | 4, 8, 16 GB | 2.4" color TFT LCD 240x320 | Touchpad | DNSe 3.0 | Yes | Yes | No | Yes | Yes | No | No | Yes | Yes | No | Yes | JPG, BMP, PNG, GIF, TXT | Yes | Yes | Yes | No | No | Yes | No | MTP/UMS |
| YP-Q3 | 2010 | Black, Pink | 4, 8 GB | 2.2" color TFT LCD 240x320 | Tactile buttons | SoundAlive | Yes | Yes | Yes | Yes | Yes | Yes | Yes | Yes | Yes | Yes | Yes | JPG, BMP, PNG, GIF, TXT | Yes | Yes | Yes | No | No | No | No | MTP/UMS |
| YP-R0 | 2009 | Black, Silver, Pink | 4, 8, 16 GB | 2.6" color TFT LCD 240x320 | Tactile buttons | DNSe 3.0 | Yes | Yes | Yes | Yes | Yes | Yes | Yes | Yes | Yes | Yes | Yes | JPG, BMP, PNG, GIF, TXT | Yes | Yes | No | Yes | No | No | No | MTP/UMS |
| YP-R1 | 2009 | Black, Silver, Pink | 4, 8, 16, 32 GB | 2.6" color TFT LCD 400x240 | Touch screen | DNSe 3.0 | Yes | Yes | Yes | Yes | Yes | Yes | Yes | Yes | Yes | Yes | Yes | JPG, BMP, PNG, GIF, TXT | Yes | Yes | Yes | No | Yes (2.0+EDR) | Yes | No | MTP/UMS |
| YP-R2 | 2011 | Black, Silver | 4, 8 GB | 3" color TFT LCD 400x240 | Touch screen | SoundAlive | Yes (also mp3HD) | Yes | Yes | Yes | Yes | Yes | Yes | Yes | Yes | Yes | Yes | JPG, BMP, PNG, GIF, TXT | Yes | Yes | Yes | No | No | No | No | MTP/UMS |
| YP-S1 | 2010 | Blue, Pink | 2, 4 GB | No screen | Tactile buttons | DNSe 3.0 Core | Yes | Yes | Yes | Yes | Yes | No | No | No | No | No | No | - | No | No | No | No | No | No | No | UMS |
| YP-S2 | 2008 | Black, Blue, Green, Red, White | 1, 2 GB | No screen | Tactile buttons | DNSe | Yes | Yes | No | Yes | No | No | No | No | No | No | No | - | No | No | No | No | No | No | No | UMS |
| YP-S3 | 2008 | Black, Blue, Green, Red, White | 2, 4, 8 GB | 1.8" color TFT LCD 176x220 | Touchpad | DNSe 2.0 | Yes | Yes | No | Yes | No | No | No | No | Yes | No | No | JPG, TXT | Yes | Yes | No | No | No | Yes | No | MTP/UMS |
| YP-S5 | 2007 | Black, White | 2, 4, 8 GB | 1.8" color TFT LCD 176x220 | Touchpad | DNSe 2.0 | Yes | Yes | No | Yes | Yes | Yes | No | No | Yes | No | No | JPG, TXT | Yes | Yes | Yes | No | Yes (1.2) | Yes | Yes | MTP/UMS |
| YP-T10 | 2007 | Black, White, Lime, Red, Purple | 2, 4, 8 GB | 2" color TFT LCD 240x320 | Touchpad | DNSe 2.0 | Yes | Yes | No | Yes | No | No | No | Yes | Yes | No | Yes | JPG, TXT | Yes | Yes | Yes | No | Yes (2.0+EDR) | Yes | No | MTP/UMS |
| YP-U4 | 2008 | Blue, Red, Purple | 2, 4 GB | 1" 16-grey OLED 128x64 | Touchpad | DNSe 2.0 | Yes | Yes | No | Yes | No | No | No | No | No | No | No | - | Yes | Yes | Yes | No | No | No | No | MTP/UMS |
| YP-U5 | 2009 | Black, Blue, White, Red, Pink | 2, 4 GB | 1" 16-grey OLED 128x64 | Tactile buttons | DNSe 3.0 Core | Yes | Yes | Yes | Yes | Yes | Yes | No | No | No | No | No | - | Yes | Yes | Yes | No | No | No | No | MTP/UMS |
| YP-U6 | 2010 | Black, Pink | 2, 4 GB | 1" color CSTN LCD 128x64 | Tactile buttons | SoundAlive | Yes | Yes | Yes | Yes | Yes | No | No | No | No | No | No | - | Yes | Yes | Yes | No | No | No | No | MTP/UMS |
| YP-U7 | 2012 | Black, Silver, Pink | 4 GB | 1" color TFT LCD 128x64 | Tactile buttons | SoundAlive | Yes | Yes | No | Yes | Yes | No | No | No | No | No | No | - | Yes | No | No | No | No | No | No | UMS |
| YP-W1 | 2012 | Blue, White | 4 GB | No screen | Tactile buttons + touchpad | SoundAlive | Yes | Yes | No | Yes | Yes | No | No | No | No | No | No | - | No | No | No | No | No | No | No | UMS |
| YP-Z3 | 2011 | Black, Blue, Pink | 4, 8 GB | 1.8" color TFT LCD 128x160 | Tactile buttons | SoundAlive | Yes (also mp3HD) | Yes | Yes | Yes | Yes | Yes | No | Yes | Yes | Yes | Yes | JPG, BMP, PNG, GIF, TXT | Yes | Yes | Yes | No | No | No | No | MTP/UMS |
| YP-Z5(F) | 2006 | Black, White, Silver, Pink | 1, 2, 4 GB | 1.8" color TFT LCD 128x160 | Touchpad + tactile buttons | DNSe | Yes | Yes | No | Yes | No | No | No | No | No | No | No | JPG, TXT | Yes | No | Yes | No | No | No | No | MTP/UMS |

=== Country-specific models ===
| Model | Release | Country | Color | Capacity | Display | Controls | Sound Engine | MP3 | WMA | WAV | OGG | FLAC | AAC | Divx | Xvid | MPEG4 | H.264 | WMV | Other formats | FM tuner | RDS | Voice Recording | MicroSD slot | Bluetooth | Games | Speaker | TV tuner | Connection |
|---|---|---|---|---|---|---|---|---|---|---|---|---|---|---|---|---|---|---|---|---|---|---|---|---|---|---|---|---|
| YP-CM3 | 2009 | China | Black, Pink | 4 GB | 3" color TFT LCD 400x240 | Tactile buttons | DNSe 2.0 | Yes | Yes | Yes | Yes | Yes | No | No | No | Yes | No | Yes | RM/RMVB, JPG, BMP, PNG, GIF, TXT | Yes | No | Yes | Yes | No | No | Yes | Yes (CMMB) | UMS |
| YP-E3 | 2007 | China | Black, White | 1, 2 GB | 1" bicolor OLED | Tactile buttons | DNSe | Yes | Yes | No | Yes | No | No | No | No | No | No | No | - | Yes | No | Yes | No | No | No | No | No | UMS |
| YP-E5 | 2007 | Russia | Black | 1, 2 GB | 1.3" color TFT LCD 128x160 | Touchpad | SRS/WOW/3D | Yes | Yes | Yes | Yes | No | No | No | No | No | No | No | JPG, TXT | Yes | No | Yes | No | No | No | No | No | UMS |
| YP-MB1 | 2009 | Korea | Black | 8, 16, 32 GB | 3.3" color AMOLED 272x480 | Touch screen | DNSe 3.0 | Yes | Yes | Yes | Yes | Yes | Yes | Yes | Yes | Yes | Yes | Yes | JPG, BMP, PNG, GIF, TXT | Yes | No | Yes | Yes | Yes (2.1+EDR) | Yes | Yes | Yes (T-DMB) | UMS |
| YP-PB2 | 2008 | Korea | Black, White | 4, 8, 16 GB | 3" color TFT LCD 272x480 | Touch screen | DNSe 2.0 | Yes | Yes | No | Yes | No | No | No | No | Yes | Yes | Yes | JPG, TXT | Yes | No | Yes | No | Yes (2.0) | Yes | No | Yes (T-DMB) | UMS |
| YP-RB | 2010 | Korea | Black, Pink | 4, 8 GB | 3" color TFT LCD 400x240 | Tactile buttons | SoundAlive | Yes | Yes | No | Yes | Yes | Yes | Yes | Yes | Yes | Yes | Yes | JPG, BMP, PNG, GIF, TXT | Yes | No | Yes | Yes | No | No | Yes | Yes (T-DMB) | UMS |

== Yepp R Series ==
The R series was introduced in 2009 with the YP-R0 and the YP-R1. The YP-R2 released in 2011 is the successor to the YP-R1 but the YP-R1 is not the successor to the YP-R0, which makes Samsung's naming scheme difficult to understand.

== Yepp S Series ==
=== YP-S2 ===
The YP-S2 is a screen-less MP3 player shaped like a pebble with tactile buttons on its underside.

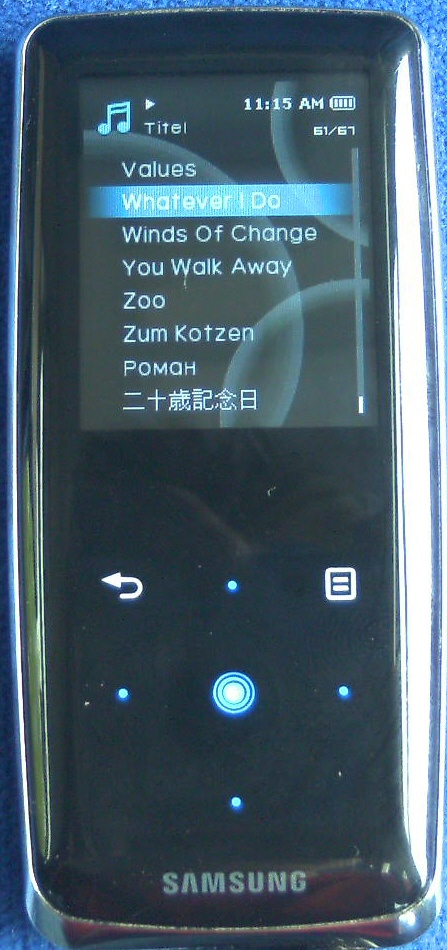
YP-S3

=== YP-S3 ===
The S3 is an MP3 player with a rounded-edges design similar to that of the YP-T9, but having a touchpad like the YP-T10. Unlike the YP-S5, it only supports Samsung's own video format (.svi) when playing videos.

=== YP-S5 ===
MP4 player with 2, 4 or 8 GB capacity and built-in slide-out stereo speaker. The S5 supports MPEG4, JPEG, MP3, AAC and WMA. Bluetooth.

== Yepp Q Series ==
=== YP-Q1 Diamond ===
Newer version of T10, has 2.4-inch screen, but doesn't have bluetooth.

=== YP-Q2 ===
Has 2.4" screen (320×240 resolution) and Samsung announces 50 hrs. of battery life but in reality it is about 25 hours. It is a cross between the Q1 and S3 since it has the Q1's screen and features, but has the S3's touchpad. It has the colored icons on the menu from those of the Samsung P3. It was released in 8, and 16 GB in April 2009.

== Yepp P Series ==
=== YP-P2 ===
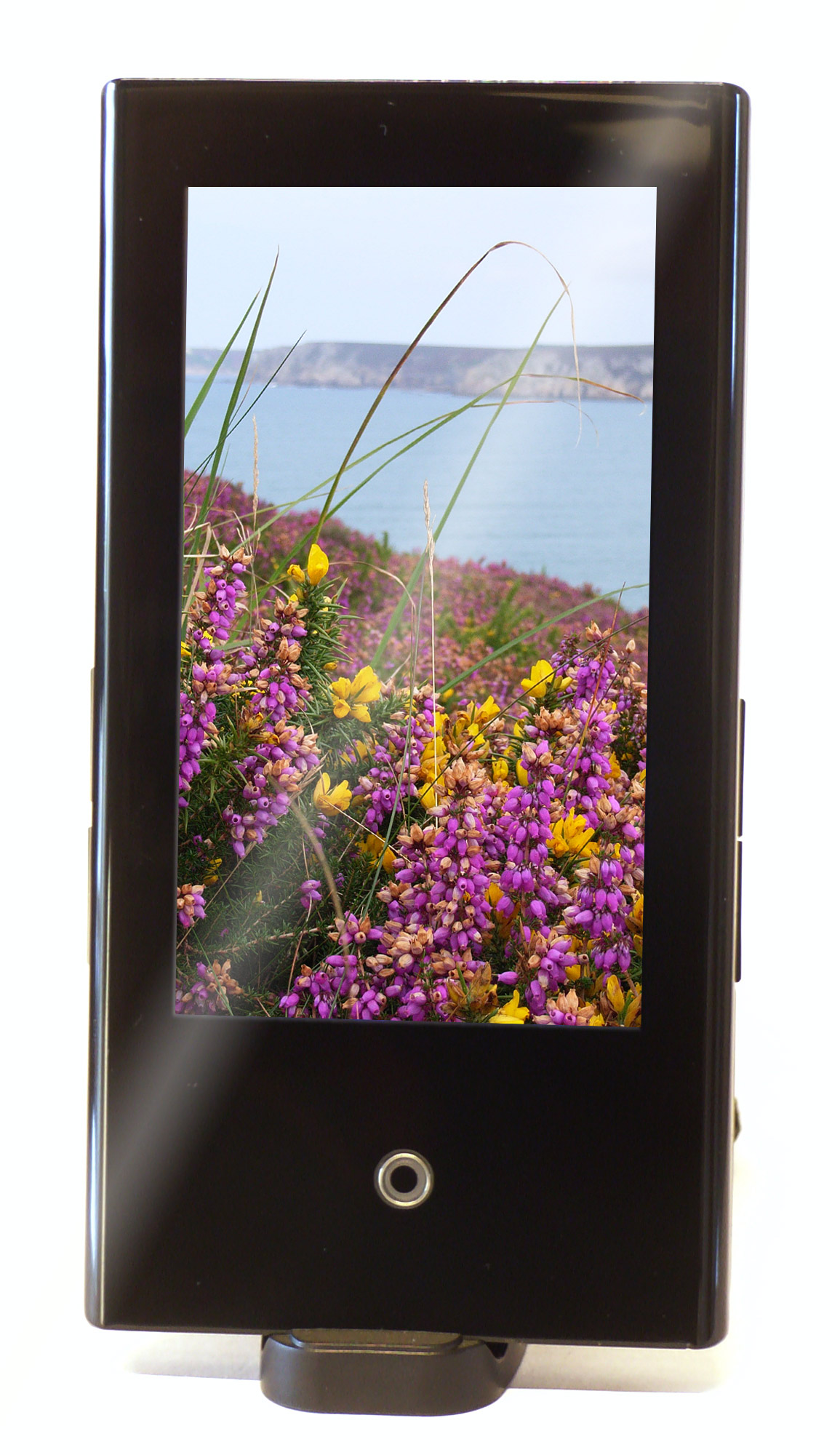
Samsung P2 (slide-show)

P2 is a flash-based PMP. P2 has a touchscreen, Bluetooth 2.0 connectivity, an FM radio, an E-Book reader and video playback capabilities (MP4 and WMV formats).

The Samsung YP-P2 comes in white, red, and black. Available capacities are 2, 4, 8 and 16 GB.

Some of the features on this device include Bluetooth stereo headphone compatibility with support for multiple sets of headphones and also sports Bluetooth phone connectivity with the ability to use your stereo headphones with your cellphone and speak through the built-in microphone on the player itself. The player also supports file transfers via Bluetooth. Another feature is the drag-and-drop interface for uploading music to YP-P2 which makes it easy interface to managing your media collection.

=== YP-P3 ===
Successor to Samsung P2 and was released in May 2009 in 8, 16, 32 GB. It has haptic feedback and menu customization with multiple pages and widgets. It supports many more video codecs including DIVX within an AVI container, in addition to H.264 video. The newest firmware, version 2.18 (Released even newer Version now 2.22) allows it support resolutions up to 800x600.

Compared to the P2, it has a much better build quality, and its back is made of aluminum, which is much more scratch resistant to the P2's painted-metal back. In addition, it has a glass screen which is far less prone to scratches; a test conducted on anythinGButipod.com showed that even a knife couldn't scratch the screen at all. It also may arrive broken so take your chances with this model

== Yepp U Series ==
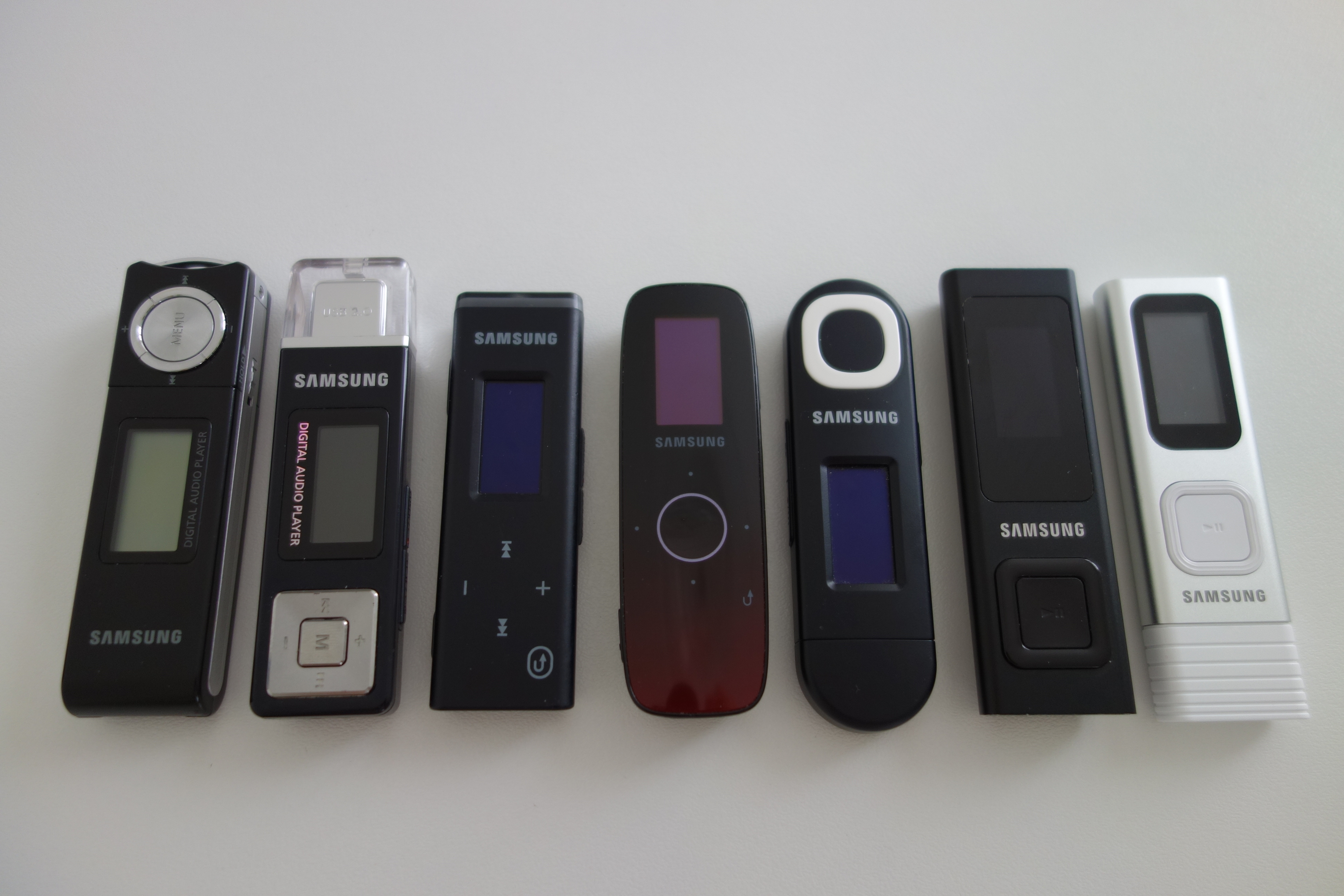
A Yepp U series collection

The Yepp U series is a famous line of USB key MP3 players introduced in 2005 with the YP-U1. The latest one YP-U7 was released in 2012. All U players have a similar USB key form factor with a 1-inch 128×64 screen. They all support MP3, WMA and OGG files but some devices support more codecs.

== Yepp K Series ==
=== YP-K3 ===
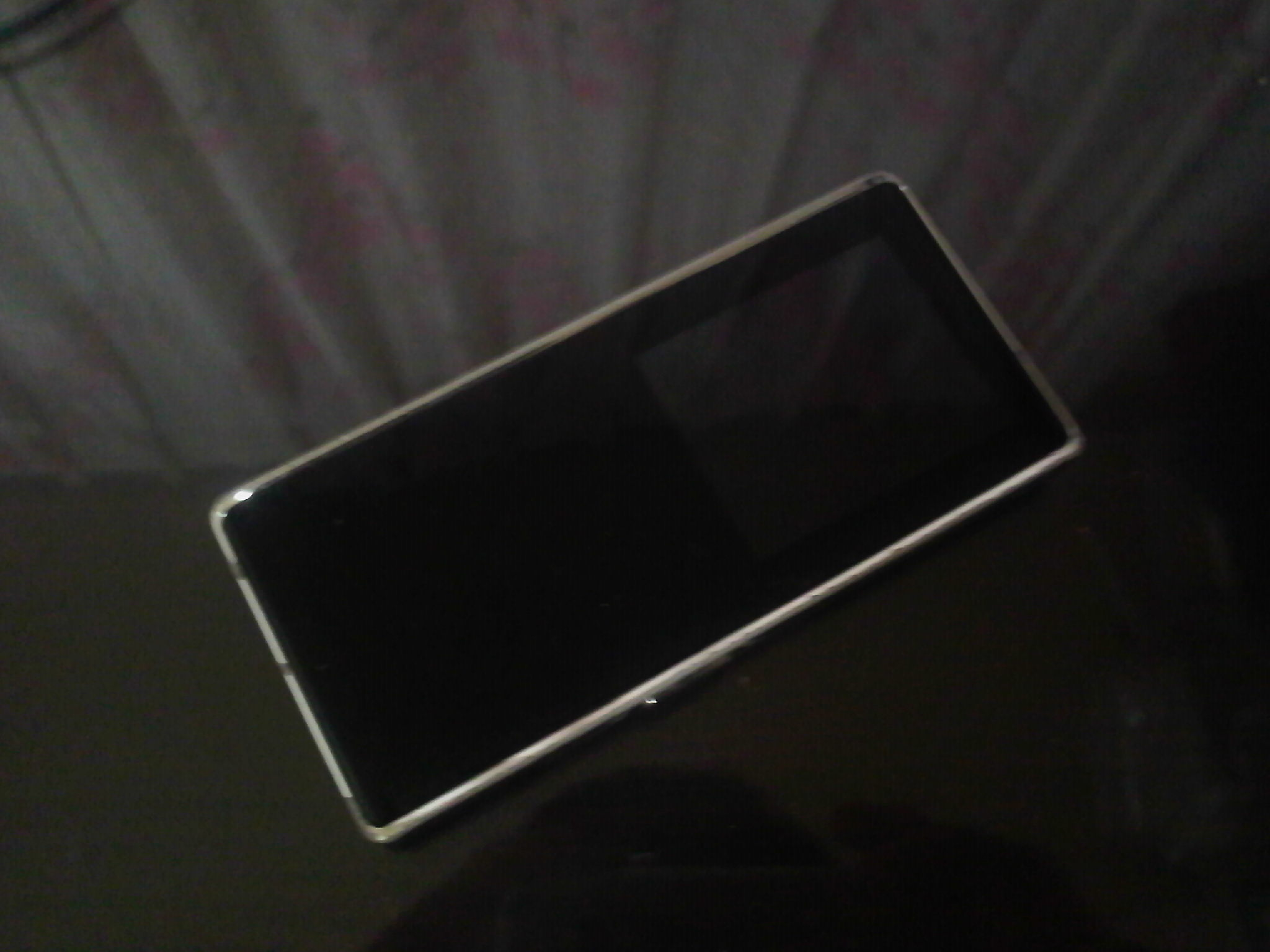
The YP-K3

The successor to the YP-K5 which is almost identical but has no speakers and is slimmer (0.28" thick) . Available in 1 GB*, 2 GB, 4 GB and 8 GB sizes. The YP-K3 comes in black, red and lime, and has the same 1.8-inch full-color OLED LCD (a dot-styled, blue-lighted OLED) as the K5. Battery life is stated to be 25 hours. The touch-pad works in all four directions to enable all the device's functions. In the bottom of the device is a 24-pin terminal, which is the same dock for charging cell phones. It drives earphones with 3.5″ stereo jack plug. Firmware available from Samsung's Korean website allows the K3 to be connected to a computer via UMS, and adds support for Ogg Vorbis and for text viewing.

Samsung Korea offer their latest Audio Player, the K3 "COLOR". it is available in different colors (*the 1 GB variant was manufactured for Argos in the UK) .

=== YP-K5 ===
Flash-based MP3 player with attached external speakers, touch sensitive controls, an FM tuner, and an OLED display which can display JPEG images. Sold by 1 GB, 2 GB, and 4 GB memory capacities. MTP based. Was replaced in 2007 by the smaller YP-S5.

== Yepp T Series ==
=== YP-T08 ===
The Samsung 08 was released only in China, and is exactly the same as the T10, but has longer battery life and a new UI, replacing Sammy character.

=== YP-T10 ===
The Samsung T10 is a flash memory (2, 4 and 8 GB) based Yepp portable media player (model name YP-T10) produced and developed by Samsung Electronics. As the newest player of the T series, the T10 abandons using the controls of the T9, but adapts the K3's.

The Samsung T10 supports Bluetooth, allowing use of a Bluetooth headset. From firmware version 2.00 it can also exchange files with other Bluetooth devices. This includes mobile phones, allowing the user to speak directly into the T10 using it as a kind of remote handset. With version 3.06 (current version), Samsung added 10 new themes (non-Best Buy only), enhanced Bluetooth support, and the ability to play games.

=== YP-T9 ===
Flash-based MP3 player with many features including an FM radio, simple Flash games, a text viewer, video playback, a picture viewer and recording from the integrated microphone or the FM radio. The YP-T9 supports WMA, OGG, and MP3 audio. The player is currently available in 2, 4 and 8 GBs. While the player is similar in size to the iPod nano (1st Generation), the screen is much bigger at 1.8″. The firmware is based on a Unix-like operating system (VxWorks) and uses Flash for animations. The International (non-US YP-T9B) version was one of the first digital audio players to feature bluetooth. This player had long pauses between transferring files with the included media studio, this has now been fixed with newer firmware (1.23 WA). Unlike some other models of Samsung digital audio devices, the YP-T9 utilizes a processor designed in-house by Samsung. As for the hardware, the unit sports the Samsung SA58700X processor (ARM 940T at 200 MHz) with integrated audio codec. The Bluetooth function allows pairing with your mobile phone allowing you to answer or dial incoming/outgoing calls. The Audio player allows multiple bookmarks. This function is great for indexing a point to go back to in a song. The audio software also allows you to vary the playback speed without loss of pitch.

=== YP-T8 ===
The Samsung YP-T8 is a brand of portable digital media player. It weighs just under 2 ounces. It has an FM tuner and recorder, along with voice and radio recording capabilities. A built-in lithium-ion battery provides up to 20 hours of playback time. The player provides a 3D audio experience and has been given the Microsoft PlaysForSure certification. File formats supported by the player include MP3, WMA, WAV, Ogg Vorbis, and ASF. Video and Gaming capabilities are also featured with this device. In order to view videos, files are encoded to MPEG-4 format by the software provided. (This software only works in the Microsoft Windows operating system.) The device also provides the capability of storing and viewing pictures in JPEG format and text files in TXT format. Lastly, the YP-T8 supports a function uncommon for portable audio players: USB Hosting.

It is available in 512 MB, 1 GB, and 2 GB versions.

Files are transferred using the Media Transfer Protocol. The YP-T8 automatically finds all playable files that have been transferred.

=== YP-T6 ===
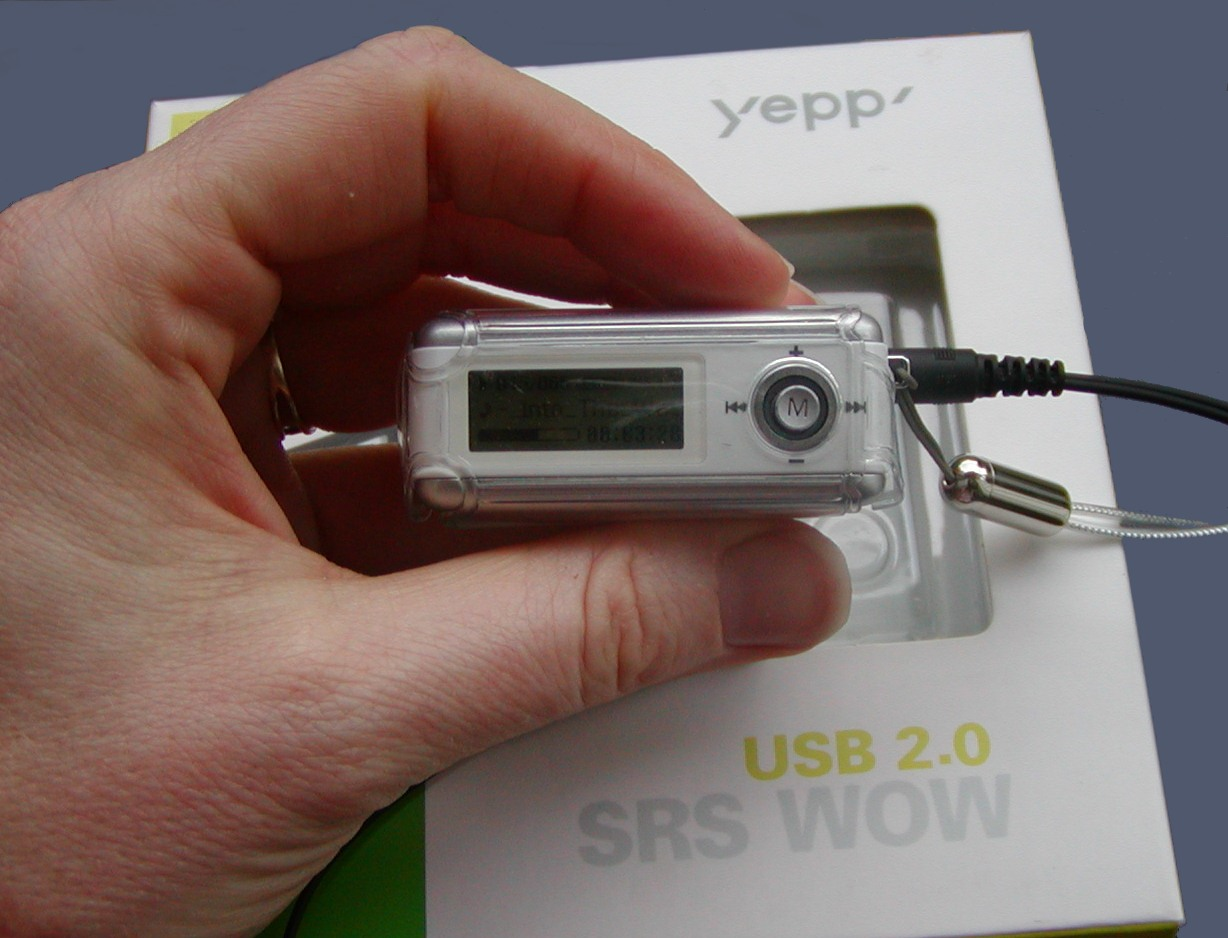
The YP-T6

The YP-T6 is 22 mm × 55 mm × 23 mm, and weighs 30 g without battery. It is available in 128 MB, 256 MB, 512 MB and 1 GB versions, and has a small 3-line LCD screen. It can play MP3, Ogg Vorbis, ASF and WMA format files, and can record voice into MP3 at bit rates from 32 kbit/s to 128 kbit/s from a built-in microphone. It supports SRS WOW HD. It is powered by a single AAA battery, which the manufacturer says gives up to 20 hours of playing time. Versions for some markets also have an FM tuner.

This player uses UMS with USB 2.0 support. After disconnecting from the computer, the YP-T6 automatically finds all playable files.

=== YP-T5 ===
The YP-T5 is a flash-memory digital audio player that supports MP3, WMA and Secure WMA (DRM) and records in WMA and MP3. It also supports SRS WOW HD and has an FM tuner. Its backlight color is adjustable. Most of the controls are provided by a jog, which has separate backlight (blue). The YP-T5 weighs 30 grams, and is powered by a single AAA battery which provides about 12 hours of continuous play. The YP-T5 is available with capacities of 128 and 256 MB.

== Other YEPP players ==
=== YP-F1 ===
The YP-F1 is a necklace-like style flash digital audio player with an LCD screen. The faceplate of the player is swappable, with several color options available. Older players had the YEPP logo on the faceplate, while later models had just the SAMSUNG logo. Storage capacities include: 128 MB, 256 MB, 512 MB, and 1 GB, although the US did not receive the base 128 MB model. It connects to a computer with a USB cable to charge the 10-hour (claimed) lithium-polymer battery and transfer files. It supports the MP3, WMA (and WMA DRM), WAV, ASF, and Ogg formats. It can receive and record FM broadcasts, and supports voice recording. The size is 1.14 in × 2.5 in × 0.6 in.

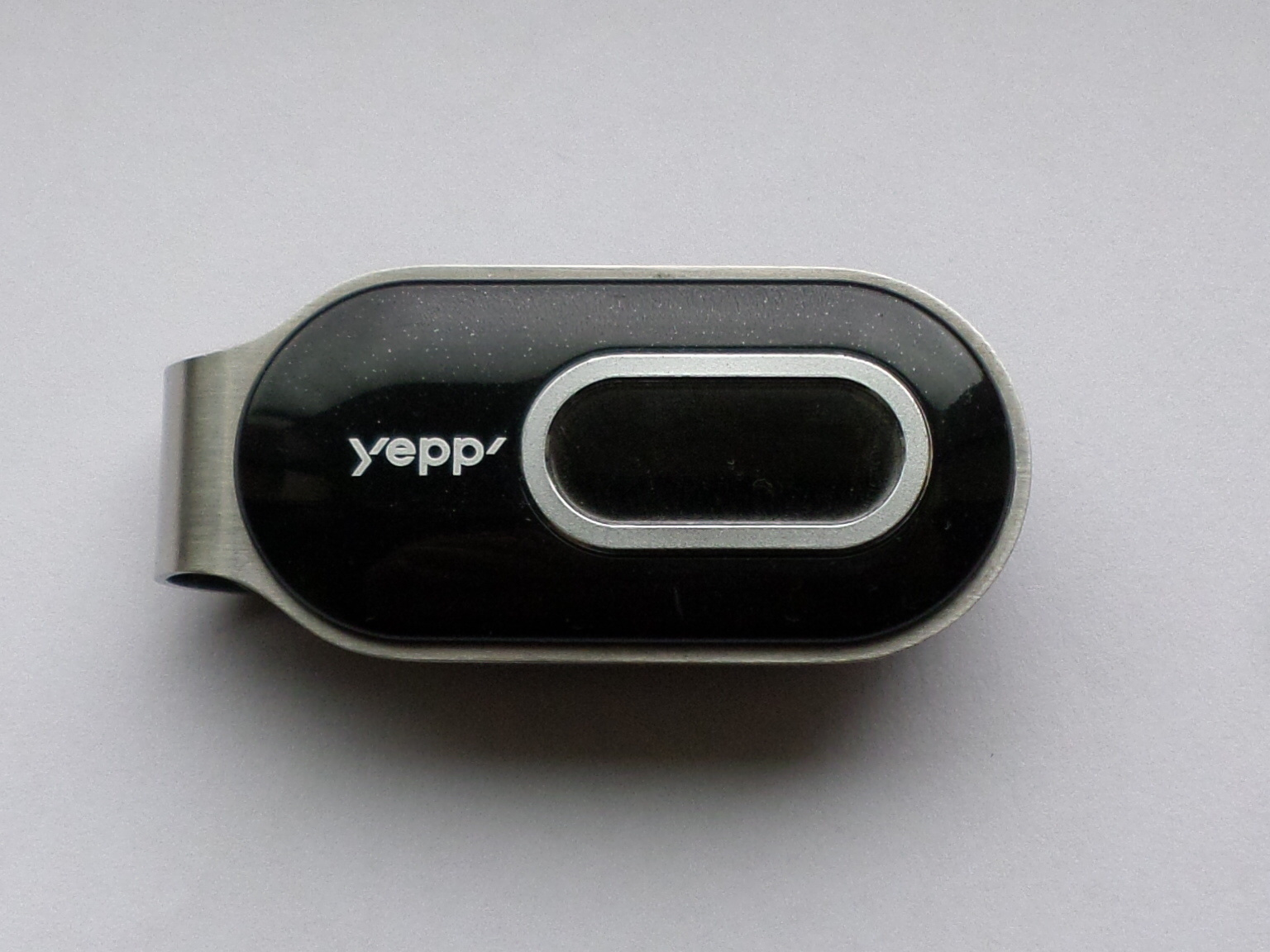
YP-F1 black faceplate

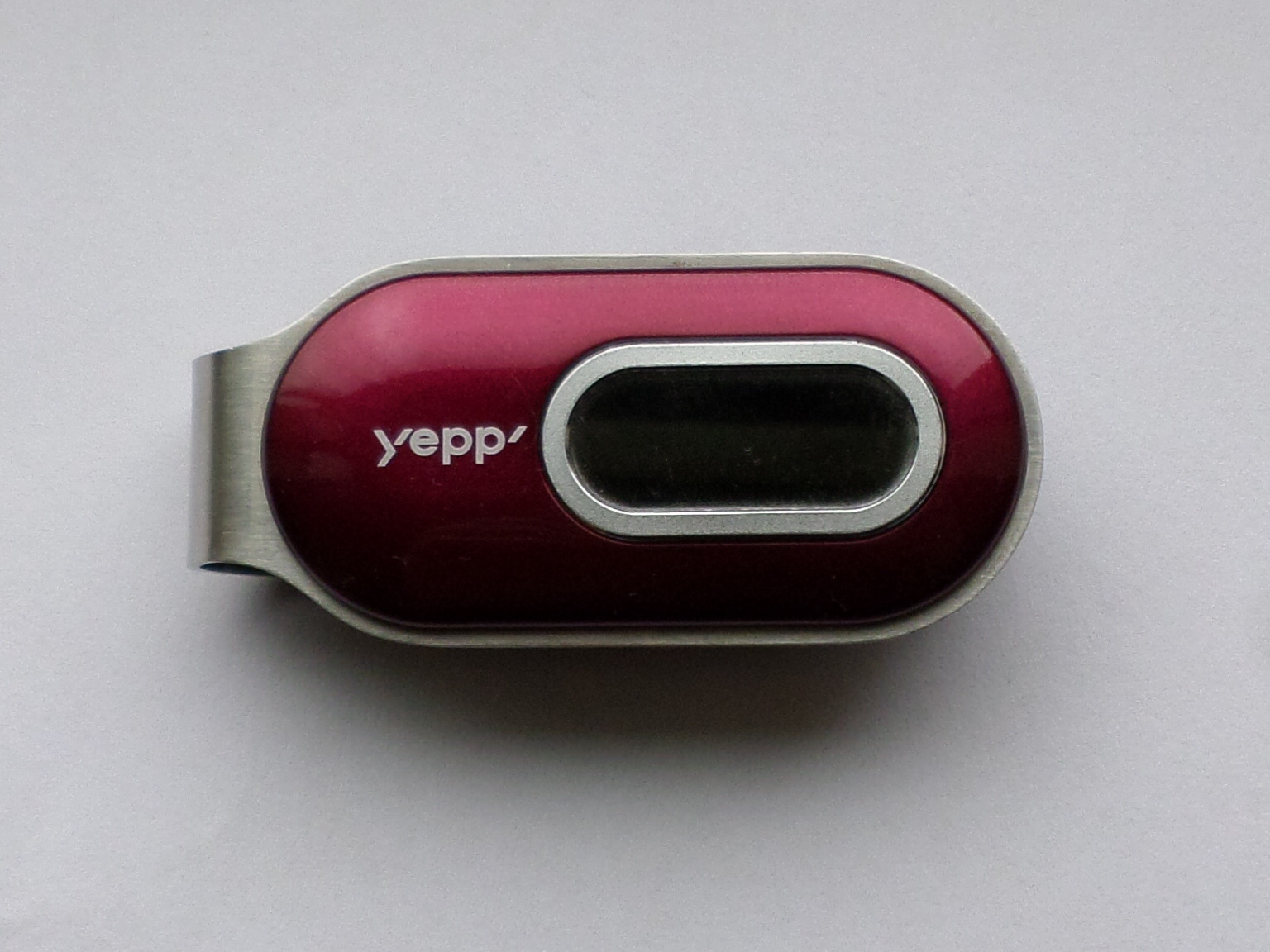
YP-F1 red faceplate

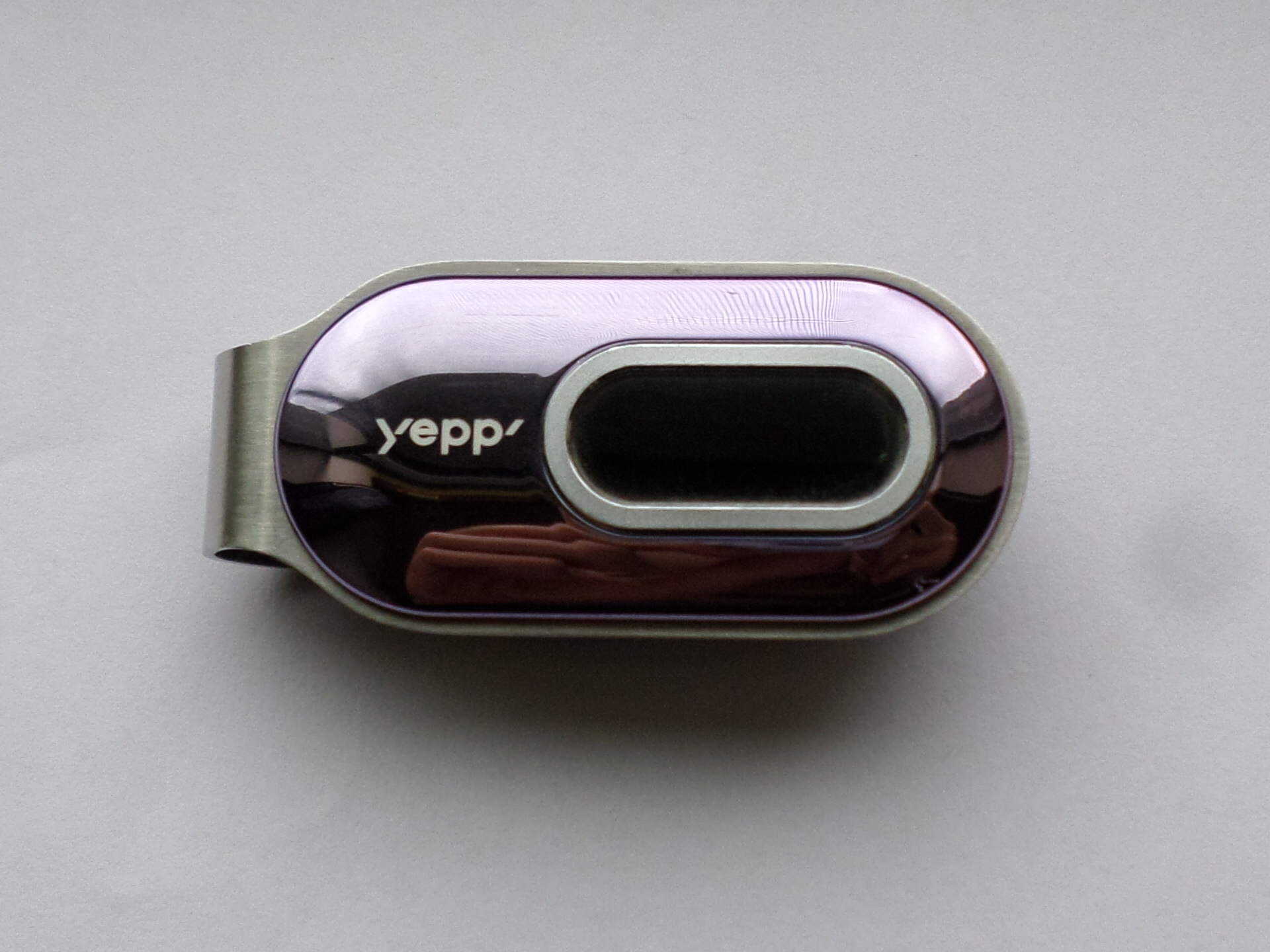
YP-F1 glossy purple faceplate

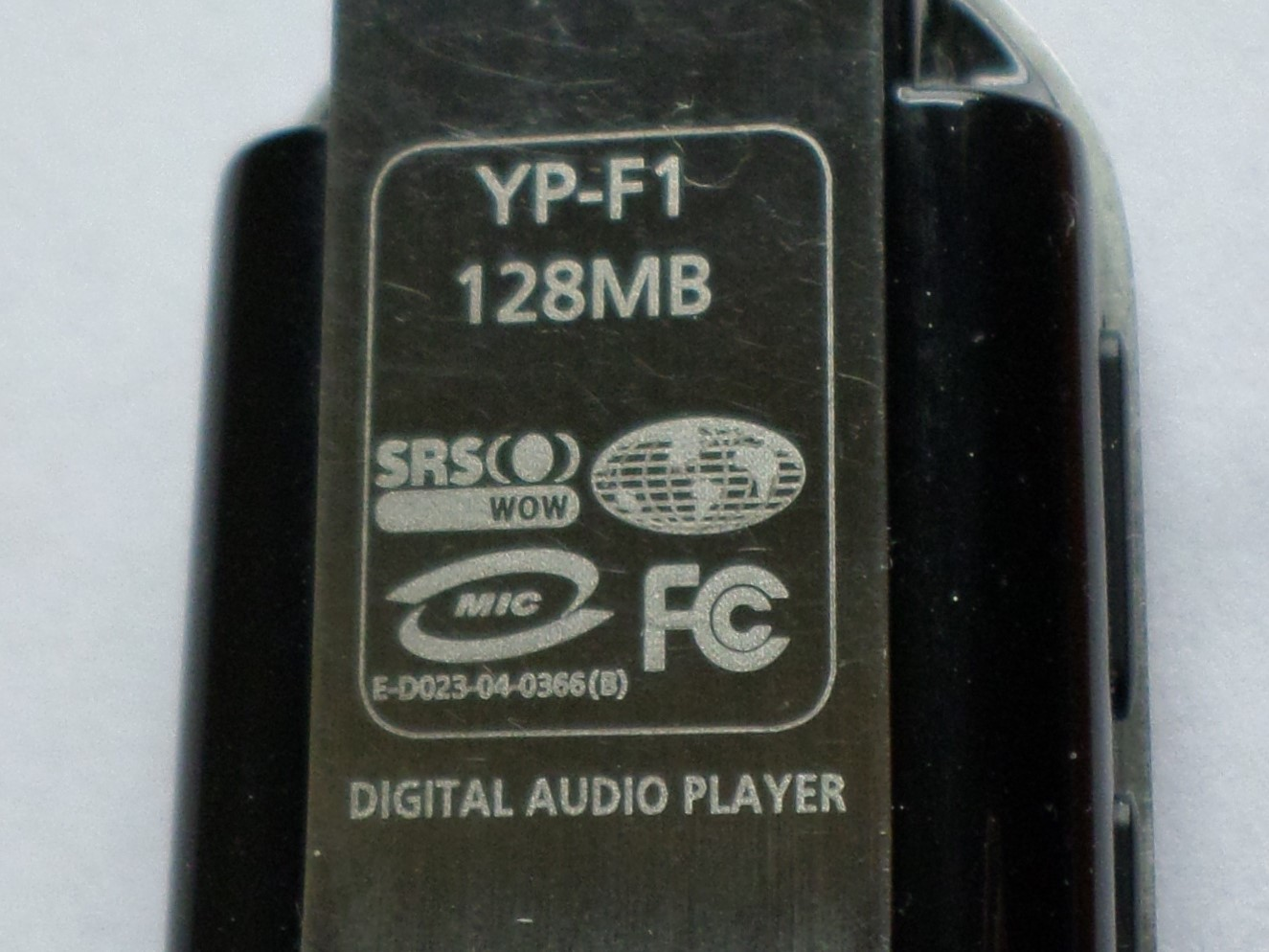
YP-F1 specification engraving

=== YP-Z5(F) ===
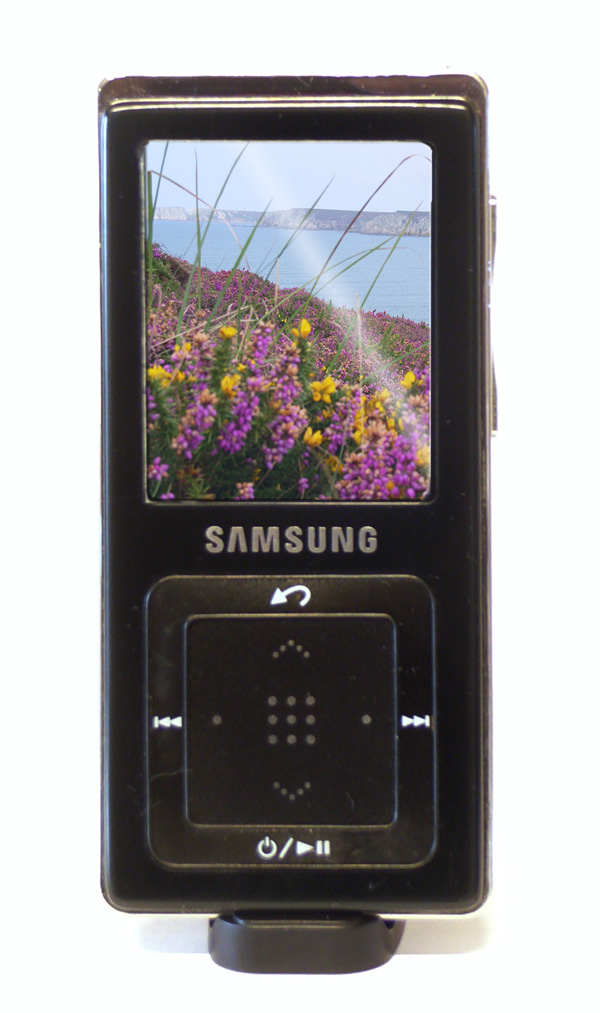
Samsung Z5 (slide-show)

Z5(F) is a flash-based digital audio player, made by Samsung Electronics. The interface for Z5(F), which implements transparency effects, was designed by Paul Mercer's Iventor software design company. Paul Mercer previously founded Pixo, the creator of the iPod's operating system. The Z5F has some features, such as an FM radio and a dictaphone, not provided on the Z5.

To celebrate the sale of one million Z5Fs, Samsung auctioned 10 gold-plated Z5Fs in Korea. The player has the re-designed YEPP logo.

According to a firmware release schedule on the official YEPP website, Z5(F) should have received a text-file reader on 30 December 2006. The firmware for a text reader was instead released in September 2007 (version 2.51).

The player was expected to support video playback, but this feature was not included in the official release, pending further testing. The feature was expected to be implemented with a later firmware release.

=== YH-999 also known as YEPP Portable Media Center ===
This player had a 3.5″ screen and with the Portable Media Center interface.

=== YP-D1 ===
This flash-memory Audio player has a maximum of 2 GB storage. It supports WMA, MP3 and Ogg Vorbis. It can play back videos on its 1.8″ TFT-LCD and features a 2-megapixel camera with flash. It can display text files and has USB hosting functions. It is almost exactly the same as the Samsung yp-t8, except it has a camera instead of the motion sensing games. Otherwise, it is the same.

=== YP-910 ===
This player has a monochrome screen and was originally manufactured for Napster, bearing both the Napster and the Samsung logos. The YP-910 weighs 6 ounces and measures about 4.25″ by 2.5″ by 0.75″—a "shirt pocket" form, like most PDAs. The player controls limit the user to only simple actions.

It provides 20 GB hard-disk space and can play MP3, WMA, and WMA-DRM. However, audio quality was reported to be mediocre. It can record from the internal FM radio or from line-in, and has a built-in FM modulator. Playback time using the internal lithium-polymer battery is up to 10 hours, but may be decreased by transmitter use, playback volume and audio files with high bit rates.

For transferring files to the player, a special version of the Napster 2.0 software that contains the device drivers has to be installed. After that, it is supposedly possible to maintain its content either via Napster or Windows Media Player. The unit was tied into Napster's DRM, which made it impossible to re-upload purchased files to another PC. Downloading more than 4,000 tracks to the device can destroy its internal library, so that its disk space cannot be used properly in most cases.

=== YP-55 ===
Originally released in 2003, the YP-55 is a flash-memory based player featuring a rotating top which operates the Fast-Forward/Rewind functions and prevents accidental usage. It was available with built-in memory sizes of 128 MB (YP-55H), 192 MB (YP-55I – sold only in Canada), 256 MB (YP-55V) and 512 MB (YP-55X). It contains a recorder for voice, radio or line-in.

The firmware is upgradeable, and can also be user modified with various programs to change things such as the button mapping and graphics. The latest firmware (version 7.300) allows for many new features, including play lists and the ability to remember its place in four different files at once. The latter feature makes it more suitable for audio books, as it makes searching for where one left off unnecessary. The original YP-55 models came with a gray cloth case, later models used a plastic case which allows access to all the controls without opening it.

=== YP-60 ===
Announced in 2004, this was one of the first sports-oriented players released by Samsung. The player is contained in a black and orange rubberized plastic housing. Sports features such as, heart-rate monitor, calorie counter, and stop watch are included on this player. In-box accessories include: a 2.5 mm adapter, sweat-proof ear phones and an arm band. It also utilizes a non-standard 2.5 mm headphone jack, line-in encoding, and FM recordings. It was released in two capacities: 128 MB (YP-60) and 256 MB (YP-60V).

=== YP-D40 ===
This player was also sold by Creative as the first Creative NOMAD.

=== YP-35 ===
A flash-based MP3 player with 64 MB (YP-35) or 128 MB (YP-35H) memory and a voice recorder function.

=== YH-J70 ===
A bulky hard-drive based MP3 audio player which comes in 20G and 30G capacities. Its rated battery life is 25 hours of audio and 5 hours of video. One of the first video mp3 players made, it was released a few months before the iPod Video. The player has an FM Radio, text viewer, video viewer, USB host, and 5 default games.

=== YP-300S/H ===
Released in 2002, the Samsung YP-300S MP3 player offers 2X MP3 technology, allowing you to maximize the memory space inside your Yepp. With 64 MB of built-in memory and a Smart Memory card slot for expandable storage, the YP300S offers hours of music playback. Features include 2X MP3 - MP3 Compression technology that allows you to downsize your MP3 files via supplied software, 64 MB of memory, Multi-format player - MP3 and WMA, Upgradeable firmware, Smart Memory card slot for expandable storage, Backlight LCD screen, 15 hours of playback time (2 AAA Batteries). Samsung YP-300H is the same player, but instead with a built-in 128 MB media (Flash) storage.

=== YP-E32/E64 ===
Released in 1999, this flash-memory audio player has a maximum of 64 mb storage (YP-E64), but also came in a 32 mb version. The memory could be upgraded with SmartMedia. It supports MP3 music, which was originally transferred using a parallel cable (later changed to USB 1.0). It came with a multi-line non-backlit LCD screen, which could display three lines of text as well as icons on a top row. The front of the device was made of aluminium and the back and buttons plastic. It featured a voice recorder, phone book and EQ settings.
