= Samsung P2 =

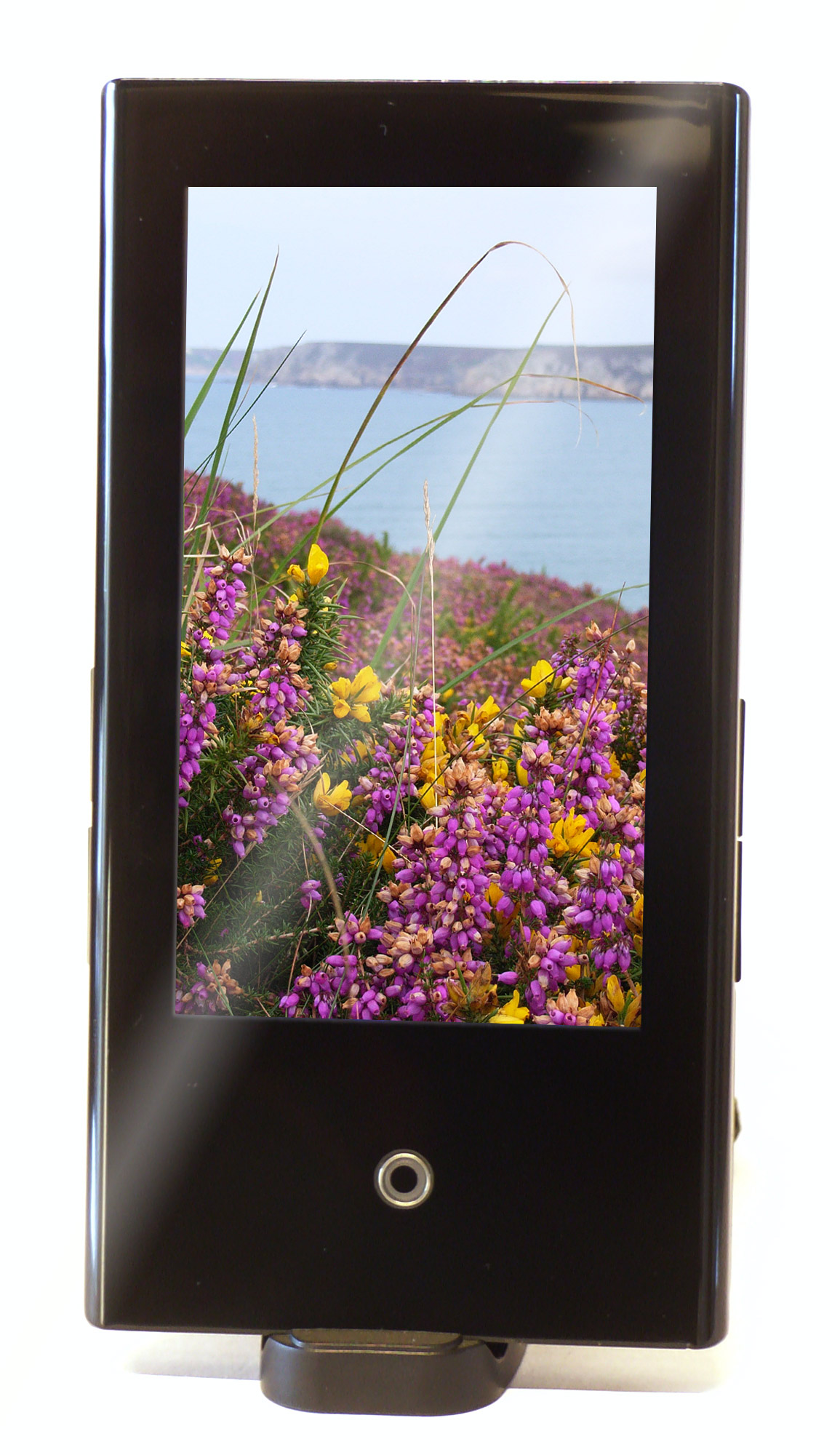
- Manufacturer: Samsung Electronics
- Type: Digital audio player Portable media player
- Lifespan: 2007 – 2009
- Storage: Available in 2GB, 4GB, 8GB and 16GB flash memory models.
- Display: Backlit TFT LCD Screen. Resolution: 480x272.
- Input: Touchscreen
- Connectivity: USB 2.0

The Samsung YP-P2 is a flash memory-based Yepp portable media player produced and developed by Samsung Electronics.

== Features ==
The P2 comes in four colors (black, blue, white & red) and comes in 2, 4, 8, and 16 GB variants; it has a touchscreen, Bluetooth 2.0 and DNSe 2.0 (Digital Natural Sound Engine), an FM radio, an eBook reader, a Datacasts feature, and a photo and video viewer.

Bluetooth features on the P2 include stereo headphone compatibility (A2DP) with support for multiple headphones and remote control (AVRCP), Bluetooth phone connectivity (HFP) with the ability to speak into the built-in microphone, and MTP capability allowing users to transfer files between devices supporting this protocol.

You can also customize your P2 by going to the main screen and clicking on Settings. You can configure the main menu design, fonts, background images, beep sounds, brightness, language, time, hold option, sleep time, auto power-off, set a password, and reverting all changes back to the default and formatting the whole device. The P2 features a fully customizable equalizer as well.

== Blue Wave updates ==
Samsung has released firmware updates in a series called Blue Wave updates. These are created in order to add value to the player after it has been released. Samsung claims that the updates are created based on customer feedback, and that they are the company's way of expressing their care for their customers.

The first Blue Wave was released in December 2007, and included support for Bluetooth phone connectivity and Bluetooth file transfer.

A second Blue Wave update was released in late January 2008 which included FM radio recording/playback, improved touch sensitivity, and three games as an additional download. This firmware update, however, was recalled from Samsung's download website soon after its release, due to numerous bug reports. A bug-fix update was released two weeks after.

A beta of the third Blue Wave (v3.15) was released on March 31, 2008. Improvements over the previous version included a calculator, more UCIs, a full-screen album art view, and the ability to play games while listening to music. Fans were disappointed of the little amount of new features this "Beyond Imagination" firmware update contained.

The final version of the third Blue Wave (v4.13) was released on April 22, 2008. This version was only for bug fixes and did not offer new features.

On May 29, 2008, the first 4th Blue wave beta (v5.05) was released in South Korea along with a new program (EmoDio) to replace Samsung Media Studio. This firmware update has been the biggest update for the P2 so far, containing password protection, subway maps of major cities, two new games, a touch-screen-only hold option, text viewing of TTS files using Emodio, voice recording, and 3 customizable user DNSes.

A second beta (v5.08) of the 4th Blue Wave was released on June 30, 2008. It only fixed bugs and did not add any new noticeable features. After a few days, on July 7, 2008, it was quietly renamed a final release. Fans were truly disappointed and much discussion arose concerning further Blue Waves for the P2.

The final 4th Blue Wave (V5.10) was released on September 10, 2008. It also fixed bug problems such as noise problems, page scroll error, track playback error on specific conditions, and playback noise.

== Regional differences ==
The South Korean version of the YP-P2 (UMS) includes support for lyrics, a subway map and also a dictionary. However, in most Western regions, MTP is used as the file transfer protocol. Still, other European countries offer RDS as the default. It is also possible to change from MTP to UMS and vice versa, and it is also possible to change the firmware's region.

== Supplied software ==
Samsung Media Studio is available on the included CD-ROM, which also contains drivers and a user manual. The software is also available for download from Samsung. This software, however, is not required to use the device as it supports the Media Transfer Protocol.

== Related products ==
The P2 clearly being its flagship product, Samsung has released a new version of the P2 with an additional port at the top to connect to an antenna and watch TV. It is called the P2 DMB or the YP-PB2, is slightly heavier, has a longer-lasting battery than the normal P2. Incorporating a DNle (Digital Natural Image engine) chip, the P2 DMB supports a higher quality screen with richer colors and crisper screens than the original. The P2 DMB comes in only black and white colors and 4 and 8 GB capacities.

== Updated Version ==
Samsung P3 is an updated version of P2 shown in CES 2009 in Las Vegas. It features haptic touch, animated screen saver and much brighter screen. Samsung also incorporates the DNSe 3.0 sound technology like the YP-Q1 Diamond. You can customize the main menu by being able to move around the icons. You can put them on multiple pages.

The Samsung P3 was released in the U.S. in May, 2009. It was released in South Korea in January, 2009. It will retail for $150 (8 GB), $200 (16 GB), and $300 (32 GB).

It supports many more video codecs including DivX within an AVI container, in addition to H.264 video. The newest firmware, version 2.10 allows it support resolutions up to 800x600.

== See also ==
- Yepp
