= Panasonic Lumix DMC-FS3 =

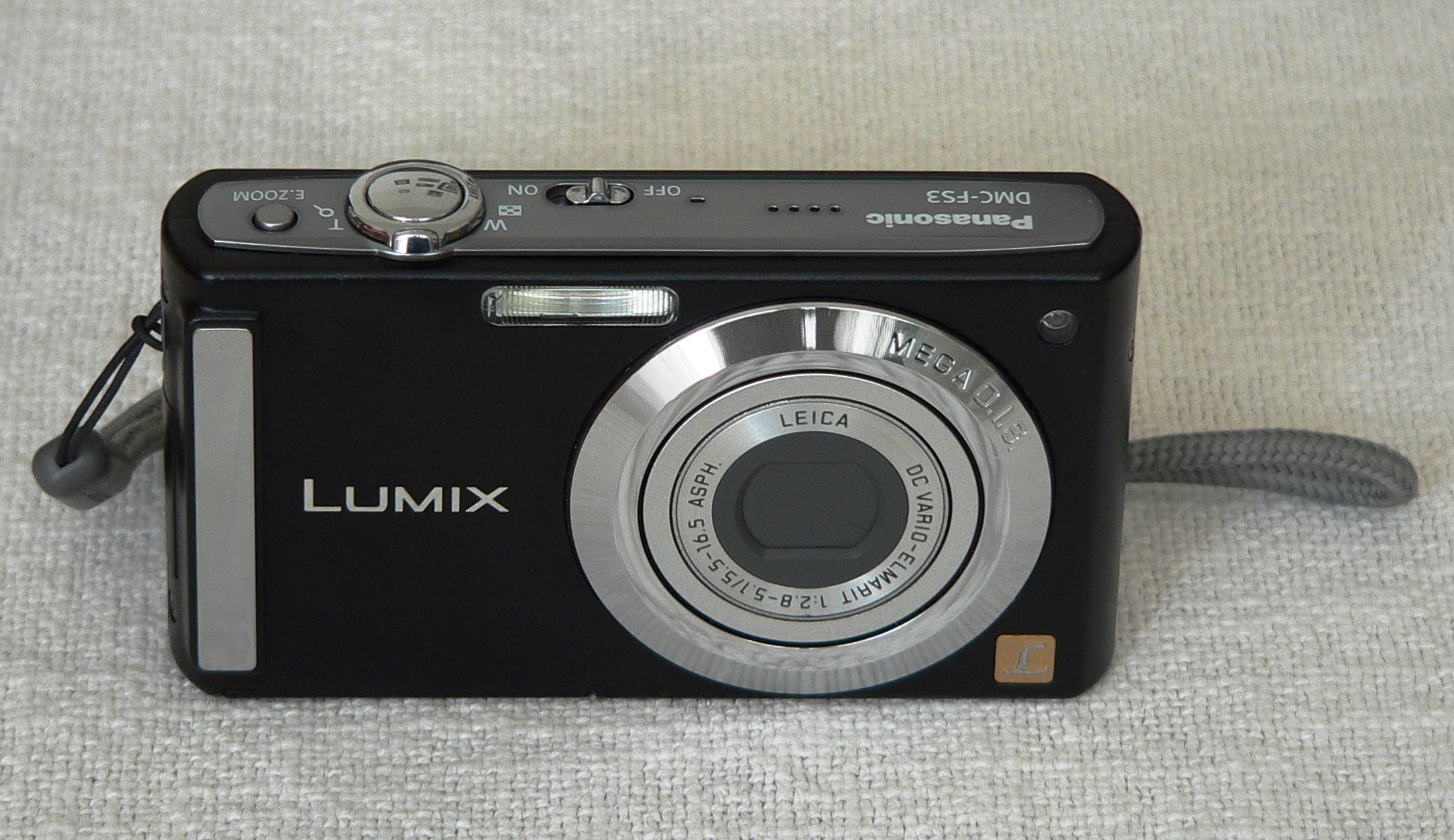
- Black colour variant of the DMC-FS3

Overview
- Maker: Panasonic
- Released: 2008

Lens
- Lens: 33-100mm equivalent
- F-numbers: f/2.8-f/5.1 at the widest; narrow f/8.0-f/14.0

Sensor/medium
- Sensor type: CCD
- Sensor size: 5.744 x 4.308mm (1/2.5 inch type)
- Maximum resolution: 3264 × 2448 (8 megapixels)
- Film speed: ISO 100 to 6400
- Recording medium: SD, SDHC or MMC memory card; internal memory
- Storage media: SD-HC (32 GB), 50 MB internal

Focusing
- Focus areas: 9 focus points

Flash
- Flash: Xenon

Shutter
- Shutter speeds: 1/2000s to 60s
- Continuous shooting: 3 frames per second (full resolution), 7 frames per second (2.5 megapixels)

Viewfinder
- Viewfinder: No

Image processing
- White balance: Yes

General
- Video recording: Max. 848×480 (WVGA) at 30 fps
- LCD screen: 2.5 inches with 230,000 dots
- Optional battery packs: Yes
- Optional accessories: Water-resistant case
- AV port(s): Composite AV, PictBridge, Mass Storage, Media Transfer Protocol
- Dimensions: 95 x 53 x 23mm (3.74 x 2.1 x 0.89 inches)
- Weight: 158 g (6 oz) including battery
- Made in: Taiwan

The Panasonic Lumix DMC-FS3 is a digital ultracompact camera announced by Panasonic on January 29, 2008. It has eight megapixels, triple optical zoom, 16:9 wide VGA video recording at 30 frames per second, versatile scene modes, and an accelerometer sensor for orientation tagging.

== Exterior ==
The DMC-FS3 has a metallic case and is available in silver, black, blue and pink colour options.

Its exterior, user interface and firmware are nearly identical to that of the Panasonic Lumix DMC-FS5.

The device is equipped with an autofocus lamp and a Xenon flash.

== Lens ==
Its Leica lens has an aperture of f/2.8 to f/5.1 and f/8.0 to f/14.0 for brighter environments, respectively at a 35mm equivalent focal length of 33mm to 100mm.

Its jitter-compensating optical image stabilization can be toggled, and optionally be set to operate while previewing in the view finder (Mode 1), or only during shutter (Mode 2), the latter of which slightly reduces power consumption. Jitter and movement can be indicated in real-time in the jitter/subject demonstration mode.^{:24,65-66}

== Burst shot ==
The DMC-FS3 supports burst shots of three full-resolution photos per second and seven two-megapixel photos per second, the latter of which is accessible through a separate scene mode.

== Video recording ==
Video recording is supported at the following resolutions, each with 30fps and 10fps options:

- 848×480 (16:9 WVGA)
- 640×480 (4:3 VGA)
- 320×240 (4:3 QVGA)

Motion JPEG is used for video recording. Optical image stabilization is enabled during video recording. Its video player allows frame-by-frame navigation. ^{:65,70}

== Connectivity ==
The DMC-FS3 can be connected to a television via composite A/V and also supports Mass Storage, Media Transfer Protocol, Picture Transfer Protocol, and direct printing through PictBridge.

== Storage ==
The DMC-FS3 supports SD-HC memory cards (up to 32 GB) and has 50 megabytes of internal storage which is intended as a temporary buffer during a memory card hot swap.^{:14}

The SD card slot is backwards-compatible with Multimedia cards.

== Display ==
The 2.5" QVGA RGB screen is able to adapt brightness and contrast levels automatically to the surrounding. While the device lacks an ambient light sensor, the brightness is measured through the image sensor.

== User interface ==
The DMC-FS3 has an additional “E.Zoom” (easy zoom) button that allows optically fully zooming in an out with one button press.

The image browser, next to standard features such as miniature image browsing and zooming, slide shows, has a calendar viewing mode and category filters.^{:68-71}

The ability to jump over an increasing number of photos at once by holding the left or right navigation button accelerates navigation through high quantities of items.^{:33}

Photos and videos can be marked as favourites, and protected from accidental deletion. Photos can additionally be labelled with a title (closed-captioned).:71

== Scene modes ==
The DMC-FS3 features various scene modes such as Landscape, which avoids focussing on a window or windshield, possibly with stains and rain drops.

It is equipped with face recognition, 9 focus fields, and a then new “Intelligent Automatic” (“iA”) mode that automatically selects the scene mode it deems most suitable.

The Sports scene mode reduces exposure time by increasing light sensitivity, to mininize motion blur on moving subjects.

Normal picture mode enables ISO light sensitivities of up to 1600. Those up to ISO 6400 are accessible through the high sensitivity scene mode, where resolution is limited to three megapixels, as noise levels at these light sensitivities render higher resolutions impractical.^{:51}

The Underwater scene mode is intended for use with the water-resistant marine case accessory, though it is the only scene mode to feature sustained autofocus locking throughout photos.^{:53}

The Night Scenery scene mode enables exposure times of up to eight seconds. Exposure times of 15, 30, and 60 seconds are accessible through the Starry Sky scene mode, intended for use with tripod.^{:40}

== Accessories ==
Accessory options for the device include a water-protected case.

The DMC-FS3 supports ISO 1222 tripod mounting.
