= Viodentia =

viodentia (sometimes written with an uppercase v) is a pseudonym used by the creator of FairUse4WM, a program that removes Microsoft's copy protection technology from Windows Media Video (".WMV") files. These files are used by popular music download sites such as Rhapsody, Yahoo! Music, and Napster.

== Background ==
A number of prominent websites use DRM to ensure that media and other downloads are unable to be copied for software piracy or other improper purposes.

This copy protection system also has the effect of preventing what would otherwise be claimed as fair use - legitimate owners backing up paid downloads in case of loss or damage to their computer data, or for use in on other devices where legal to do so.

== viodentia and FairUse4WM ==
"viodentia" is the pseudonym of one or more individuals who wrote software that would enable users to remove the protection mechanism from their media, thus allowing it to be copied for legal use. Forum posts under the name "viodentia" stated in 2006 that the program was to enable exercise of fair-use rights only, and excluded import of cryptographic data needed for piracy usage.

A lawsuit was later filed by Microsoft, on the basis that FairUse4WM contained proprietary computer code from Microsoft's Windows and/or was a derivative work of Microsoft's Windows Media Format SDK or other Microsoft DRM technologies.

According to an interview published by the weblog Engadget, Viodentia does not live in the United States.

== Lawsuit ==
On 22 September 2006, Microsoft filed a federal lawsuit against John Does 1-10 a/k/a "viodentia", hoping to identify the person or persons. An online post by Viodentia contains an implicit defense against Microsoft's allegations of copyright infringement:

"FairUse4WM has been my own creation, and has never involved Microsoft source code. I link with Microsoft's static libraries provided with the compiler and various platform SDK files."

Unable to identify or locate Viodentia, Microsoft dropped the lawsuit without prejudice in 2007.
