= Samsung Galaxy Player =

Android-based handheld computers by Samsung

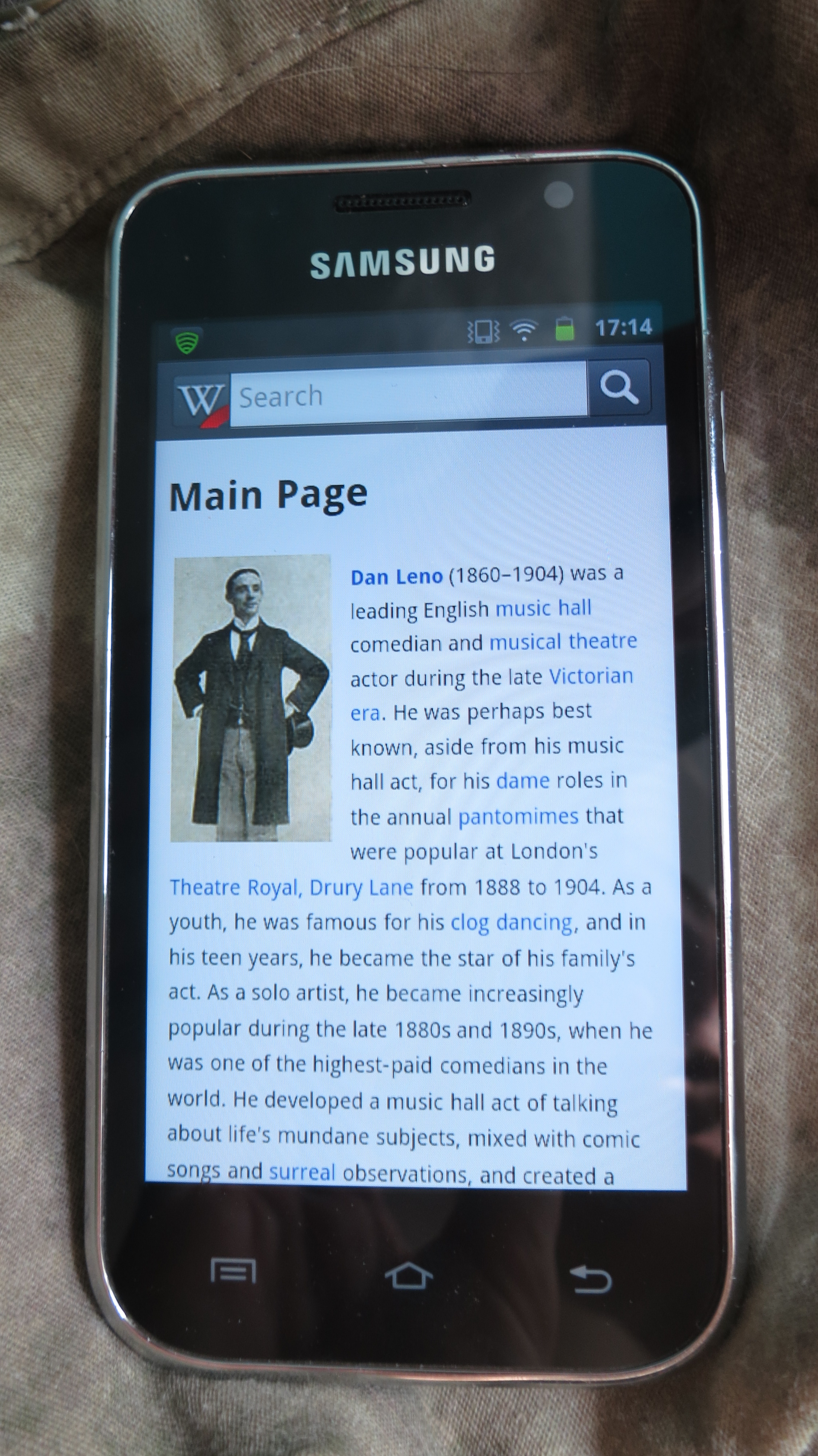
- Galaxy Player
- Developer: Samsung
- Manufacturer: Samsung
- Type: Handheld PC
- Released: October 14, 2010; 16 years ago
- Lifespan: 2010–2012
- Operating system: Android 2.2 "Froyo" (Europe); Android 2.3 "Gingerbread" (U.S.); Unofficial: Android 4.4.2 "KitKat" via CyanogenMod
- CPU: 1 GHz Samsung "Hummingbird" processor
- Memory: 486 MB RAM
- Storage: 8 GB flash memory
- Display: Galaxy Player 4.0; 800×480 px, 4.0 in (10.2 cm) WVGA Super Clear LCD; Galaxy Player 5.0; 800×480 px, 5.0 in (12.7 cm) WVGA TFT LCD
- Graphics: Lenovo ARM
- Sound: speaker, microphone, headset jack
- Input: Multi-touch capacitive touchscreen display; 3-axis accelerometer; 3-axis gyroscope
- Camera: 2/3.2 MP camera (with flash on 5.0 model)
- Connectivity: USB 2.0, Bluetooth 3.0, Wi-Fi 802.11b/g/n, FM Radio, AM Radio (Capable): Bluetooth 3.0; USB 2.0; Wi-Fi 802.11b/g/n; DLNA; FM Radio; If applied, AM Radio
- Power: Li-ion 1,200 (3.6 & 4.0),1500 (4.2) & 2500 (5.0) mAh, Audio Playback: Max 36 Hr(Default setting, MP3 128 Kbps, Volume 15, Normal Sound, Display Off), Video Playback: 5 hrs.
- Online services: 1887
- Dimensions: Galaxy Player 4.0; 123.7 mm (4.87 in) H 64.2 mm (2.53 in) W 9.9 mm (0.39 in) D Galaxy Player 5.0; 141.3 mm (5.56 in) H 78.2 mm (3.08 in) W 11.9 mm (0.47 in) D
- Weight: Galaxy Player 4.0; 121 g (4.27 oz); Galaxy Player 5.0; 182 g (6.42 oz)
- Related: Samsung Galaxy S
- Website: http://www.samsung.com/us/mobile/mp3-players/YP-G1CWY/XAA

The Samsung Galaxy Player (known as the Samsung Galaxy S WiFi in Europe) is a line of discontinued Android-based all-purpose pocket computers produced by Samsung. The product was debuted on 2 September at the 2010 IFA in Berlin, and was showcased at the 2011 CES in Las Vegas.

== Models ==
All of the Galaxy Player models support 3-axis accelerometer. The Galaxy Player 4.2 also supports 3-axis gyroscope.

Galaxy Player 50 (YP-G50)

The Galaxy Player 50 (not to be confused with Galaxy Player 5.0) was the first Samsung Android-based media player, announced at the 2010 IFA and released early 2011. It features a 3.2 inch 400 x 240 pixels TFT-LCD, 8 or 16 GB internal memory, a microSDHC slot, 1000mAh battery, Bluetooth 3.0, RDS FM tuner and 2 MP rear camera. It runs on Android 2.1 Eclair.

Galaxy Player 4.0 or Galaxy S WiFi 4.0 (YP-G1)

The Galaxy Player 4.0 features a 4" multi-touch capacitative touchscreen, a "Super Clear" LCD with 800x480 resolution (WVGA). It has 8 GB of internal flash storage, that can be expanded with a microSD card (up to 32 GB cards are supported). It has two cameras (a VGA front camera, and a 3.2 megapixel back camera), WiFi, FM radio, and a GPS, and runs Android 2.3.5 ("Gingerbread"). Development teams have created an unofficial Android 4.0 ("Ice Cream Sandwich") port. Its design is almost the same of the Samsung Galaxy S phone (I9000) but with a lower resolution camera (3.2 MP instead of 5.0 MP) and without phone functions or 3G. The CPU is a Samsung Exynos 3110 Applications Processor.

Samsung announced that the Galaxy S WiFi 4.0 would be released in the first half of 2011, starting with the UK. The Galaxy Player 4.0 and 5.0 launched in U.S. in October 2011.

Galaxy Player 5.0 or Galaxy S WiFi 5.0 (YP-G70)

The Galaxy Player 5.0 features a micro-SD card slot allowing for up to an additional 32 GB of storage. The CPU is an Exynos 3110 1Ghz Application Processor. It has an estimated 60-hour battery life during music playback and 8 hours during video playback. As of now, the Galaxy Player 5.0 comes preloaded with Android 2.2.2 Froyo in Europe, and Android 2.3.5 Gingerbread in the US. Development teams have created an unofficial Android 4.0 ("Ice Cream Sandwich"), Android 4.4 ("KitKat") up to Android 5.1.1 ("Lollipop").

Galaxy Player 3.6 or Galaxy S WiFi 3.6 (YP-GS1)

The Galaxy Player 3.6 carries a 3.65" LCD TFT (with a resolution of 480×320) instead of the AMOLED which is used by Samsung in most of its phones. The internal storage is flash 8 GB that can be expanded via a microSD card. The CPU is a single core 1 GHz based on ARM Cortex-A8 based CPU core (OMAP3630). It has a removable battery. It runs on the Android 2.3 Gingerbread OS.

The player has a 2.0 MP camera on the back, GPS location services, and an accelerometer.

The player supports Wi-Fi (802.11b/g/n) as well as Bluetooth 3.0 (A2DP, AVRCP, OPP, PBAP).

Galaxy Player 4.2 or Galaxy S WiFi 4.2 (YP-GI1)

The Galaxy Player 4.2 has a 4.2" IPS display at 800 x 480, 1 GHz processor, front and rear cameras and Android 2.3 Gingerbread. It has a removable battery and microSD card slot.

Galaxy Player 5.8 (YP-GP1)

The Galaxy Player 5.8 has a 5.8 inch qHD LCD at a resolution of 960 x 540, 1 GB of RAM, dual-core 1 GHz processor, a 3.0 megapixel camera with no LED flash, and will ship with Android 4.0 Ice Cream Sandwich, although some versions have been known to ship with Android 4.0.3. It has the same 2500 mAh battery as the Galaxy Player 5.0 and comes in 16 and 32 GB variants, with a microSD card slot supporting up to 32 GB of extra storage.

Galaxy 070 or Smart Home Phone 2 HD or 스마트홈 폰 HD mini (YP-GI2)

The Galaxy 070 features a 4.2 inch 800 x 480 pixels TFT LCD, dual-core ARM Cortex A9 1.2 GHz CPU, Bluetooth 3.0, 1300 mAh battery, 8 GB internal memory and microSDXC slot. It runs on the Android 4.1 Jelly Bean. It was released in August 2013 in Korea only. It was only sold by Korea Telecom and marketed as a home phone with specific apps allowing SMS and calls via WiFi. It is the latest Galaxy Player released.

== Codec support ==
Audio: MP3, M4A (AAC, AAC+, eAAC+), AMR (AMR-NB, AMR-WB), WMA, OGG, FLAC

Video: MP4, 3GP, AVI (DivX, Xvid), WMV, ASF, H.263/H.264

== Pricing ==
Suggested retail pricing in the U.S. is $149.99 for the 3.6 model, $199.99 for the 4.2 model, $229.99 for the 4.0 model & $269.99 for the 5.0 model.

== See also ==
- iPod Touch
- Samsung YEPP
