= Janus (DRM) =

Digital rights management system

Janus was the codename of a version of Windows Media DRM primarily for portable devices, whose marketing name was Windows Media DRM for Portable Devices (or in short form WMDRM-PD). It was introduced by Microsoft in 2004 for use on portable media devices which store and access content offline. Napster To Go was the first online music store to require the Janus technology. Supporting Janus often implies that the device also makes use of Media Transfer Protocol (MTP).

Janus initially required supporting devices to not support non-Microsoft audio formats such as Ogg Vorbis, but this requirement was later removed.

== Characteristics ==
To support Janus, devices must support:

- Secure time
- License storage for content items
- Meters

All of these are supported by way of challenge–response authentication commands.

== Devices that used Janus ==
- Most BlackBerry OS devices
- Audiovox SMT 5600 smartphone
- Toshiba Gigabeat S
- Cowon iAudio X5 (as of firmware 2.11b1)
- Cowon iAudio U3
- Creative Zen portable players (except Stone and Stone Plus)
- Dell DJ 20GB (Gen 2)
- Dell DJ 30GB
- Dell Pocket DJ
- iRiver Clix
- iRiver H10 series (with MTP firmware only)
- H320 (US version only; after upgrading to EU/KR/JP firmware, DRM capabilities are lost)
- H340 (US version only; after upgrading to EU/KR/JP firmware, DRM capabilities are lost)
- iRiver PMC-120 (Portable Media Center)
- Samsung YH-925 (not Australian or European version as onboard radio is lost if firmware is upgraded)
- Samsung YH-999 Portable Media Center
- Samsung YP-T7Z
- Samsung YP-U2JXB/W
- Palm OS devices running Pocket Tunes Deluxe software
- Archos 404
- Archos 504
- Archos 604
- Archos 604 Wi-Fi
- Archos AV700
- Archos AV500
- Archos Gmini402
- Archos Gmini500
- All Windows Mobile devices running Windows Media Player 10
- Nokia N72
- Nokia N91
- TrekStor vibez
- Microsoft Zune (though incompatible with the PlaysForSure stores)
- SanDisk Sansa
- Popcorn Hour C-200
- All Roku DVP devices
