= Samsung YP-S3 =

Type of media player

YP-S3
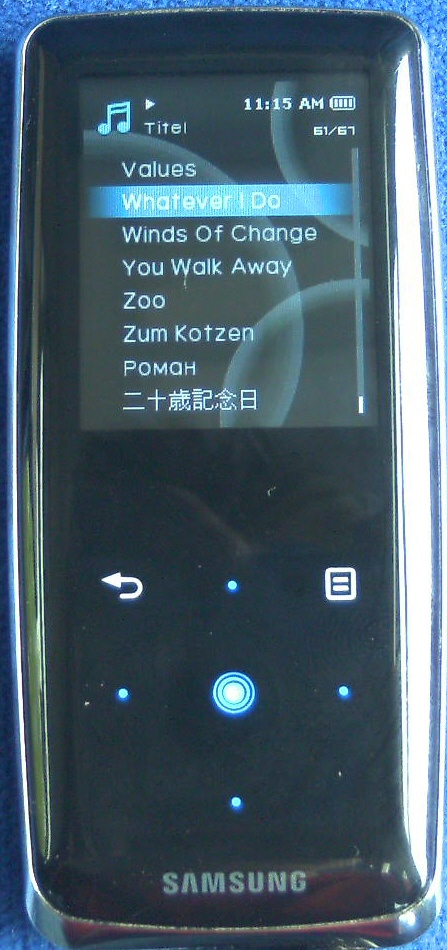
- Samsung YP-S3
- Manufacturer: Samsung Electronics
- Type: Portable media player
- Series: YEPP
- First released: 2008
- Predecessor: YP-K3
- Successor: YP-S5
- Dimensions: 3.74 in (95 mm) H 1.73 in (44 mm) W 0.39 in (9.9 mm) D
- Weight: 1.76 oz (50 g)
- Operating system: Proprietary OS, latest firmware 1.12
- System-on-chip: Samsung S5L8700 SoC
- Storage: 2 GB, 4 GB, 8 GB
- Battery: 580 mAh lithium polymer
- Display: 1.8" color TFT LCD 176x220
- Sound: Wolfson WM1800G
- Connectivity: USB 2.0 (proprietary cable)
- Data inputs: Touchpad

The Samsung YP-S3 (or simply Samsung S3) is an MP3 player produced and manufactured by Samsung Electronics released in 2008.

== File Support ==
The Samsung YP-S3 supports the MP3, WMA, MPEG4, Ogg, SVI, JPEG, and TXT file formats.

== Features ==
The Samsung YP-S3 has several features. It has:

- FM Radio
- FM Radio Recording
- DNSe 2.0 Sound Engine
- Picture Viewer
- Text Viewer
- Video player
- Games
- Podcasting

=== Tools & Other Features ===
- Alarm Clock
- Album Art
- Wallpaper
- Screen Saver
- Clock

== File Management, Battery & Storage ==
MP3 Files in the Samsung S3 are managed through albums, songs, artists, and genre. A favorites list is an option.

=== Applications ===
The S3's Applications include Music, Videos, Prime Pack, Settings, Data Casts, FM Radio, Pictures, and a File Browser.

=== Storage Space ===
The Samsung YP-S3 may contain 2 GB, 4 GB or 8 GB of internal storage space.

=== Battery life ===
Samsung claims up to 25 hours of music playback (with MP3 formatted 128 kbit/s files and volume 15/30) or 4 hours of video playback on one charge.

== See also ==
- Samsung Electronics
- Samsung YEPP
