= Samsung T10 =

Portable media player produced and developed by Samsung Electronics

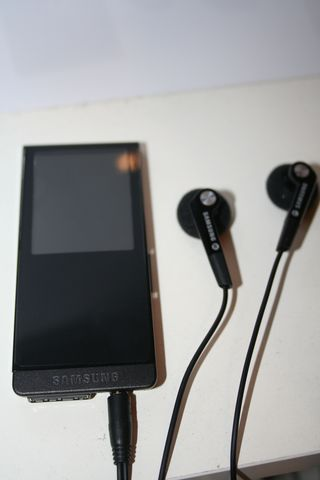
- Manufacturer: Samsung Electronics
- Type: Digital audio player Portable media player
- Lifespan: 2007-2008
- Storage: Available in 2, 4 and 8 GB flash memory
- Display: Backlit TFT LCD Screen
- Input: Touch controlled D-pad, Power/Hold slider
- Connectivity: USB 2.0, Bluetooth

The Samsung T10 is a flash memory based Yepp portable media player (model name YP-T10) produced and developed by Samsung Electronics. As the newest player of the T series, the T10 abandons using the controls of the T9, but adapts the K3's.

The Samsung T10 is bluetooth compatible allowing it to connect to a bluetooth headset. With Firmware Version 2.00, it can also send and receive songs, videos, pictures etc. to and from other bluetooth devices. This includes mobile phones, allowing the user to speak directly into the T10 using it as a kind of remote handset. With version 3.06 (current version), Samsung added 10 new themes (non-Best Buy only), enhanced Bluetooth support, and the ability to play games. The mascot is a dancing dog named Sammy.

== Supported file formats ==
The T10 supports MP3, WMA, AAC, and Ogg Vorbis audio formats. The text viewer only supports plain text files. The photo viewer supports only JPEG photos. The video viewer supports WMV and MPEG4/SVI (.svi is the same as a DivX/Xvid encoded video in an avi).

== Regional differences ==
The Korean version of the YP-T10 supports synchronized lyrics embedded in songs and video bookmarking. In most regions, MTP is used as the file transfer protocol. However, switching to UMS from MTP and vice versa is possible, but most likely voids the player's warranty in all regions. Moreover, European versions offer RDS. There is also a special Best Buy version that contains custom firmware with direct Rhapsody link-up.

== Promotion ==
Samsung released 5 games with Sammy, promoting the T10 under the banner "Sammy's Gamebox". The games are music-themed.

== Style ==
The T10 is 7.9 mm thick and the screen is 2 inches across. It can come with storage capacities of 2GB, 4GB and 8GB. On load-up the default style is Sammy. It comes with two other styles, Pendant and one where the user chooses a custom wallpaper.
