= Mp3HD =

Audio codec

MPEG-1 Audio Layer III HD
- Filename extension: .mp3
- Developed by: Technicolor
- Initial release: 2009
- Type of format: Audio compression format, audio file format
- Extended from: MP3, MPEG-1 Audio Layer III
- Website: Official website

MPEG-1 Audio Layer III HD (more commonly known by its abbreviation mp3HD) was an audio compression codec developed by Technicolor, formerly known as Thomson.

It featured lossless compression of audio data, and was usually backwards compatible with the MP3 format by storing two data streams in one file.

== Development ==
mp3HD was released in March 2009 as a lossless competitor to the already popular FLAC, Apple Lossless, and WavPack. In theory, the format provided a convenient container in the form of a single file, which included the standard lossy stream playable on any mp3-capable device and the lossless data which was stored in the ID3v2 tag.

To play the lossless data, the user needed a compatible mp3HD player with decoder. Otherwise, only the lossy data would be played. Files produced by the algorithm were substantially smaller than the uncompressed source files, though they are roughly comparable to other lossless formats.

Since 2009, Technicolor updated the format and encoding tools to make it more efficient, while adding a plugin for Winamp (Windows only), a DirectShow filter for Windows Media Player, and an mp3HD converter.

As of April 2013, the MP3HD website, specification and encoder software are no longer available, and promotion of the format has been abandoned.

== Encoding ==
The only available mp3HD encoder was the Technicolor toolkit which contained a command-line encoder and decoder. This could be used with the Exact Audio Copy to rip CDs into WAVE files and then automatically convert them to mp3HD files. Another method was the mp3HD Converter, which could convert WAVE files to mp3HD and decompress them back to WAVE files. mp3HD supported CD audio (PCM) at 44.1 and 48 kHz sampling rates at 16 bit/sample. Nero Burning ROM also supports converting to mp3HD with Nero Recode.

== Audio quality ==
The lossless mp3HD stream allowed for exact replication of CD-quality audio tracks. Average bitrates varied between 500 kbit/s to 900 kbit/s depending on genre, similar to other lossless codecs. The lossy stream used the same bit rates as a normal MP3 file and the lossy portion could use VBR or CBR depending on the user's preference for compression and quality.

== Pros and cons ==
Pros

- Exact replica of a CD.
- Lossy/lossless hybrid.
- Size is about the same compared to other lossless formats.
- Usually backwards compatible with standard MP3 players.
- Retains .mp3 file extension.
- Popularity of the MP3 brand.

Cons

- Not widespread due to lack of support. The nature of the codec was very Windows-centric, and didn't have much software support there, which may have ultimately helped contribute to its failure. There also simply weren't a lot of programs to work with it on Mac and Linux.
- Much larger files than standard MP3.
- Larger files than most pure lossless formats which do have widespread support.
- No quality boost if player only supports standard mp3.
- Lossless portion is stored in an ID3v2 tag.
- The size of ID3v2 tags is limited to 256 MB by specification. The lossless portion cannot be larger than this.
- Editing the ID3v2 tag can inadvertently result in losing the lossless data, turning the file a standard MP3.
- Despite being marketed as backwards compatible, some software that wasn't aware of what the lossless data was would read into the tag and incorrectly display the runtime of the song. This is made possible due to the fact that the ID3 tagging format was never part of the MPEG Audio specification, and the use of the tag for arbitrary data instead of metadata is undefined by the ID3 specification, there are no actual guarantees how software that reads an ID3 tag will interpret dozens or hundreds of MB of data in such a tag.
- The ease of data loss and undefined nature of storing arbitrary data in an ID3 tag makes the concept ill-suited for this purpose, and rather something of a gross hack which only happens to work as intended due to luck (if the backwards compatibility does not fail catastrophically due to undefined behavior) or specialized software that knows exactly what mp3HD is.
- The mp3HD files were one big file (instead of WavPack's lossy plus correction-file method) whether they play back as mp3HD or not. As of 2023, most platforms play FLAC files, and it is always lossless.

== Products that support mp3HD ==
Hardware

- Samsung IceTouch (YP-H1), Samsung announced that they will be releasing the first mp3 player capable of playing mp3HD lossless part of the format at CES 2010. They were supposed to be released sometime in 2010, but as of April 8, 2011 nothing has been released.
- Samsung YP-Z3 is the world first mp3 player released to support mp3HD (released end of August 2011)
- Samsung YP-R2 (released in November 2011)

Software

- Winamp w/ plugin (Windows only)
- Windows Media Player w/ direct show filter
- mp3/HD/surround/SX player (Windows and Mac)

== Alternative technologies ==
Lossless

- FLAC
- WavPack
- Monkey's Audio
- ALAC
- TTA

== See also ==
- Lossless Compression
- Lossy Compression
- Audio Compression
