= Carmier Dupoy T.10 =

1950s French aircraft

T.10

General information
- Type: sports aircraft
- Manufacturer: Carmier
- Designer: Pierre Carmier
- Number built: 1

History
- First flight: 1924

The Carmier Dupoy T.10 is a 1920s French single-seat high-wing monoplane aircraft designed by Pierre Carmier.

== Specifications ==
Data from

General characteristics

- Crew: one
- Length: 5.00 m (16 ft 5 in)
- Wingspan: 8.00 m (26 ft 3 in)
- Height: 1.70 m (5 ft 7 in)
- Wing area: 14.00 m^{2} (150.7 sq ft)
- Powerplant: 1 × Anzani 3A 3-cylinder air-cooled radial piston engine, 22 kW (30 hp)
- Propellers: 2-bladed SIPA propeller

Performance
