= IRiver P7 =

Flash memory portable media player

iRiver P7
- Manufacturer: iRiver
- Type: Portable Media Player
- Released: 2009
- Media: 4–16 GB flash memory
- Display: 480 × 272 px (WQVGA), 4.3 in (109 mm)
- Input: Touchscreen
- Connectivity: 3.5 mm headphone jack, 24-pin properietary data/power USB cable

The iRiver P7 is a flash memory based portable media player (PMP) that was developed and sold by iRiver in 4 GB, 8 GB and 16 GB variants. It was announced at the 2009 Consumer Electronics Show.

The P7 has a minimalist design and its form factor tablet styled, with a then large display of 4.3 inch. It features a range of capabilities including music and video, FM radio and voice recording, but does not have web browsing. The Flash-based home screen is modelled after a magazine layout. However unlike the iriver Spinn, there are no Flash games on the P7. There is also a mono speaker on its back and an SD card slot. It comes with a stylus.

Video formats that the P7 supports are: WMV, AVI, MP4 and FLV, with codec support for H.264, MPEG-2, MPEG-4 and XviD. As with many previous iRiver players, it has SRS WOW sound equaliser and enhancement technology.

== Reception ==
CNET reviewed the P7 giving it a score of 6.3, praising its design but commenting that it comes up short in features. PCMag UK liked its large screen, sleek design and features, but criticised the touchscreen and lack of web browing capability, rating it 3 out of 5. ExpertReviews.co.uk said in its review that the iRiver P7 has great audio quality but let down by "frustrating" touchscreen. What Hi-Fi? gave it a score of 3 out of 5.
