= MPIO =

MPIO may refer to:

== Science and technology ==
- Multipath I/O, in computer storage
- Mpio or MPIO, a former Korean electronics manufacturer
- Micron-sized particles of iron oxide, see Olfactory ensheathing cell#Labeling OECs

== Other uses ==
- Max Planck Institute for Ornithology, a former research institution in Bavaria, Germany

== See also ==
- MIMO, in radio
