= H300 =

H300 may stand for:

- Iriver H300 series of portable audible players
- Toyota HiAce (H300) light commercial van
- Hyundai H300 light commercial van
- Qiling H300 light truck, manufactured by Dorcen
- H300, GHS hazard statement code for "Fatal if swallowed"
