= H120 =

H120 may refer to:

- Iriver H100 series
- Airbus Helicopters H120 Colibri
- H.120
