= E100 =

E100 or E-100 may refer to:

== Electronics ==
- Casio Cassiopeia E-100, a pocket-size PC
- iRiver E100, a portable media player

== Vehicles ==
=== Automobiles ===
- Baojun E100, a Chinese electric microcar
- JMEV E100, a Chinese electric city car
- Toyota Corolla (E100), a Japanese compact car lineup

=== Military vehicles ===
- Panzerkampfwagen E-100, a proposed German World War II super-heavy tank

== Other uses ==
- Curcumin, food coloring from turmeric designated by E number E100
- Neat ethanol fuel, or E100, a fuel blend with almost 100% ethanol
