= X20 =

X20 or X-20 can refer to:

== Consumer electronics ==
- Fujifilm X20, a digital compact camera
- iRiver X20, a portable media player
- ThinkPad X20, a laptop

== Rail ==
- Mihara Station (station code: JR-X20), in Hiroshima Prefecture, Japan
- South African type X-20 water tender
- TGOJ X20, a Swedish electric train

== Other uses ==
- X20 (album), a 2007 album by Suicide Commando
- X20 (New York City bus)
- Boeing X-20 Dyna-Soar, a United States Air Force spaceplane program
- Toyota Mark II (X20), a two-door coupé
- X20, a British X-class submarine

== See also ==
- Jet X2O, computer game
- X²O Badkamers Trophy, a Belgian cyclo-cross series
