= D-Click =

Navigation control system

The D-Click System is a navigation control system developed by iriver for some of their portable media players. D-Click features physical buttons that are under a device's screen and hence not visible, thus it involves "clicking" the screen. Effectively, it makes the screen act as a 4-way directional control pad D-Click is used by users on these devices to find music, videos, photos or play games.

The D-Click System is patented by iriver.

== Models with D-Click ==
- iriver U10
- iriver clix
- iriver B20
- iriver S10
- iriver S7
- iriver clix (2nd generation)
- iriver Lplayer
- iriver E100
- iriver E50
