= Mpio =

MPIO Co., Ltd.
- Native name: 엠피오
- Formerly: DigitalWay Co., Ltd.
- Traded as: KRX: 066200
- Industry: Portable music players
- Founded: 1998; 28 years ago
- Founder: Woo Jung-ku
- Defunct: 2008 (changed into Innoblue Industries)
- Headquarters: Jeongja-dong Bundang-Gu, Seongnam, Gyeonggi-do, South Korea
- Divisions: DigitalWay Inc. (USA); mpio-PEROS GmbH (Germany); DigitalWay Shanghai Co, Ltd. (China)
- Website: www.mpio.co.kr

MPIO or Mpio (Hangul: 엠피오) was a South Korean consumer electronics brand and company. Established in 1998 by Woo Jung-Ku, it was one of Korea's early manufacturers of MP3 players and was known for producing portable digital audio players, media players and CD players capable of decoding MP3 data files on CDs. Previously, the company was known as DigitalWay Co., Ltd.

== History ==
The company, originally as DigitalWay, was created as an OEM developer for large corporations - its first client was Samsung and the first product from their contract, a Samsung-branded MP3 player, debuted at the 1999 Consumer Electronics Show. In 2000, the company launched its own brand, Mpio, which eventually would become the name of the company. By 2002 it held 20% of the worldwide DAP market, including 15% in Europe and North America and 30% in Japan. The vast majority of its sales came from its own Mpio brand rather than through contracts of other firms. Mpio was noticeably better known outside of South Korea itself.

In Japan, Mpio players were sold by Adtec Co., Ltd., a fully owned subsidiary of DigitalWay. In 2005, Mpio Japan Co., Ltd. was formed as a successor business.

In September 2004 DigitalWay merged with a company called Yes Com Co., Ltd. and registered on the KOSDAQ exchange. MPIO became the name of the new company.

Mpio's first jukebox player was the HD-100 in 2004 with a 20 GB hard disk, aiming to capture sales away from the iPod and iriver H300 series. Half of its sales that year were from North America. However, its situation in the market deteriorated in 2005. Unlike iriver which could depend on domestic sales for survival, 90% of Mpio's revenue came from outside South Korea. The company posted a net loss of 21 billion won ($21.7 million) in 2005. In April 2006, founder and CEO Woo Jung-ku sold 8% out of 15% of his personal shares in the company to SW Net, a company specialising in jewellery. Then, Jung-Ku now as an employee, was dismissed from the company and was replaced by SW NET's president Kang Shin-woo.

On November 10, 2006, Shin-woo and other members of the company's board of directors were accused in Korean media of embezzlement, as much as 9.8 billion won. This was followed by resignations and the bankruptcy of one of its subsidiaries. Chung Myung-an held a temporary CEO position until it was filled by Kim Jeong-ho. The company announced its entry in the biodiesel business and entered the development of ozone-free halogen light bulb development. In August 2007, MPIO announced that CEO Jeong-ho embezzled 9 million won, 134% of MPIO's equity capital.

In 2008 the company had renamed itself Innoblue Co., no longer in the MP3 business, and it is now involved mainly in pollution reduction equipment.

== Products ==
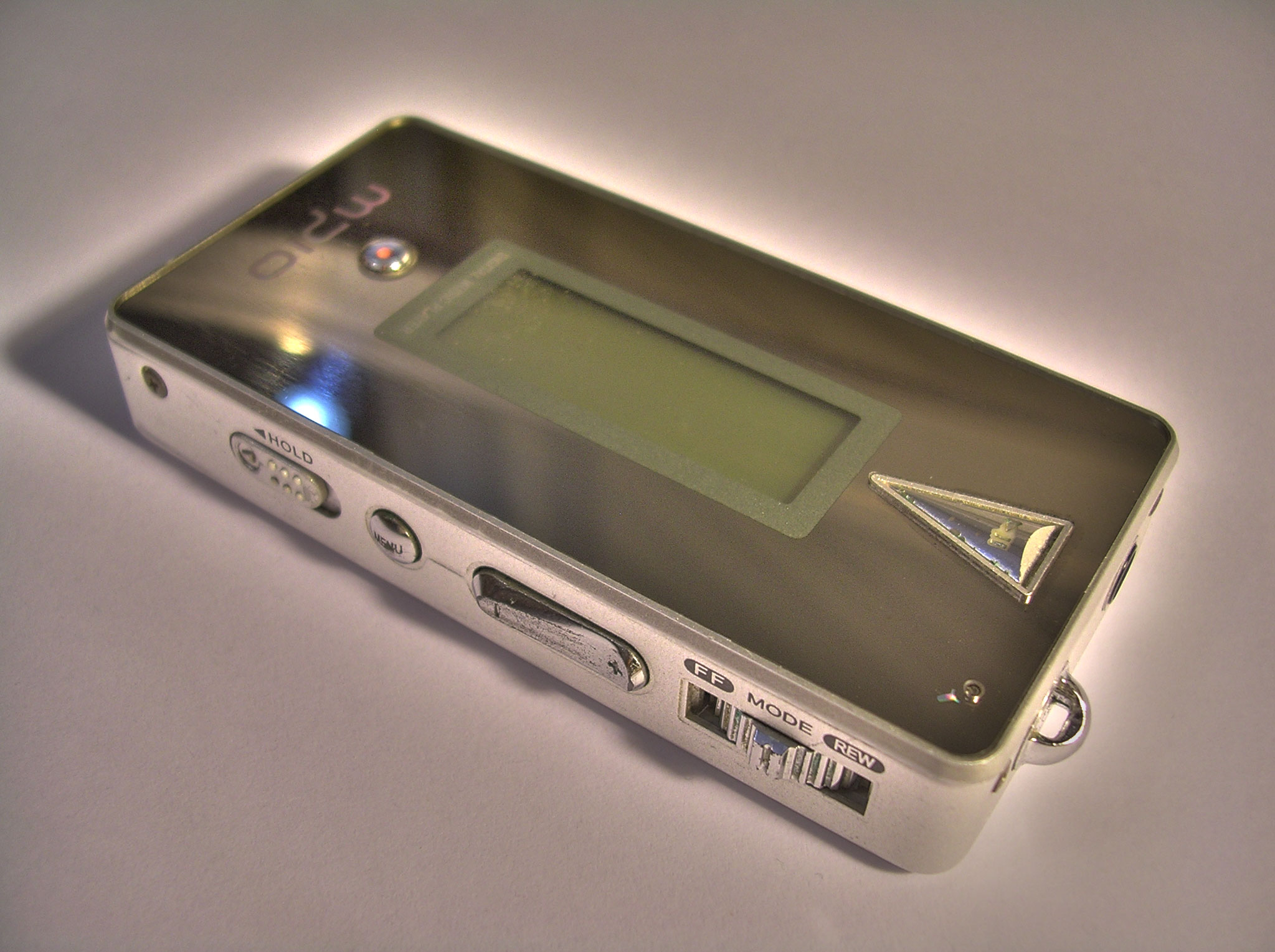
Mpio FL100 MP3 player (2003)

Product list of MPIO:

=== MP3 players ===
2000

- MP10, Mpio's first player originally as OEM then under its own brand, rectangular shaped
- DMU10, rectangular shaped
- DMV10, rectangular shaped
- EX-MP, square shaped
- DMY10, square shaped
- DMJ10, square shaped

2001

- DMG, square shaped player, 32/64/128 MB memory, with a SmartMedia slot plus built-in microphone for recording and WMA playback support. Also sold as the Odyssey 200 and 300 by licensee e.Digital.
- DMB, rectangle shaped player, 32/64/128 MB memory, with a SmartMedia slot for extra 128 MB expansion

2002

- DMG Plus, update of DMG
- DMB Plus, update of DMB with additional FM radio recording and a line-in
- DME, smaller variant of DMG/DMB. Also sold as the Odyssey 100 by licensee e.Digital.
- DMK, small keychain style player, 64/128 MB

2003

- FD100, square shaped player that was popular
- FL100, rectangular player that was popular
- FY100, "sporty" player
- HD100, Mpio's first jukebox and hard drive player, 20 GB memory

2004

- FY200, white coloured player that continued the DMK's design, a successful model.
- FY300, primitive designed with USB stick. Also sold under the name Stormblue Xuke MP-500.
- FL200, medallion style. Also sold under the name Beadsounds EMP-Z.
- FG100
- FL300, update of FL200, medallion style
- FY400, update of FY300.
- HD300, jukebox, 20/40 GB memory.
- HD200, microdrive player, 5 GB.

2005

- FG200 (One), high-end flash player with colour display
- FY600, small budget-oriented player
- FY500/FY500SE, small budget-oriented player
- FL350, medallion update of FL300
- PD100, player that can also pick up DAB radio and record from it alongside FM
- i-Bulldog, budget sub-brand

2006

- HD400 (SOLID), microdrive player, 8 GB.
- FL400 (QUARTZ), medallion player
- FY700, budget player
- FY800, 1/2/4 GB flash player with SD card slot for expansion
- FL500, medallion style player

2007

- MG100, 9.2 mm thick player
- ML100, renamed from FY900
- ML300
- MG300, 2/4/8 GB PMP

2008

- FY1000, 2/4/8 GB PMP
- FY500SE
- PD100

=== MP3 CD players ===
- CMG
- CL100
- CL200

=== Others ===
- Playit X3 (HRP250 / HRP160), Home Media Player
- HS100 / HS200, USB storage devices
- DC100, digital camera (for use with DMG and DMB music players)
