= IRiver Clix =

Portable media player

iRiver Clix

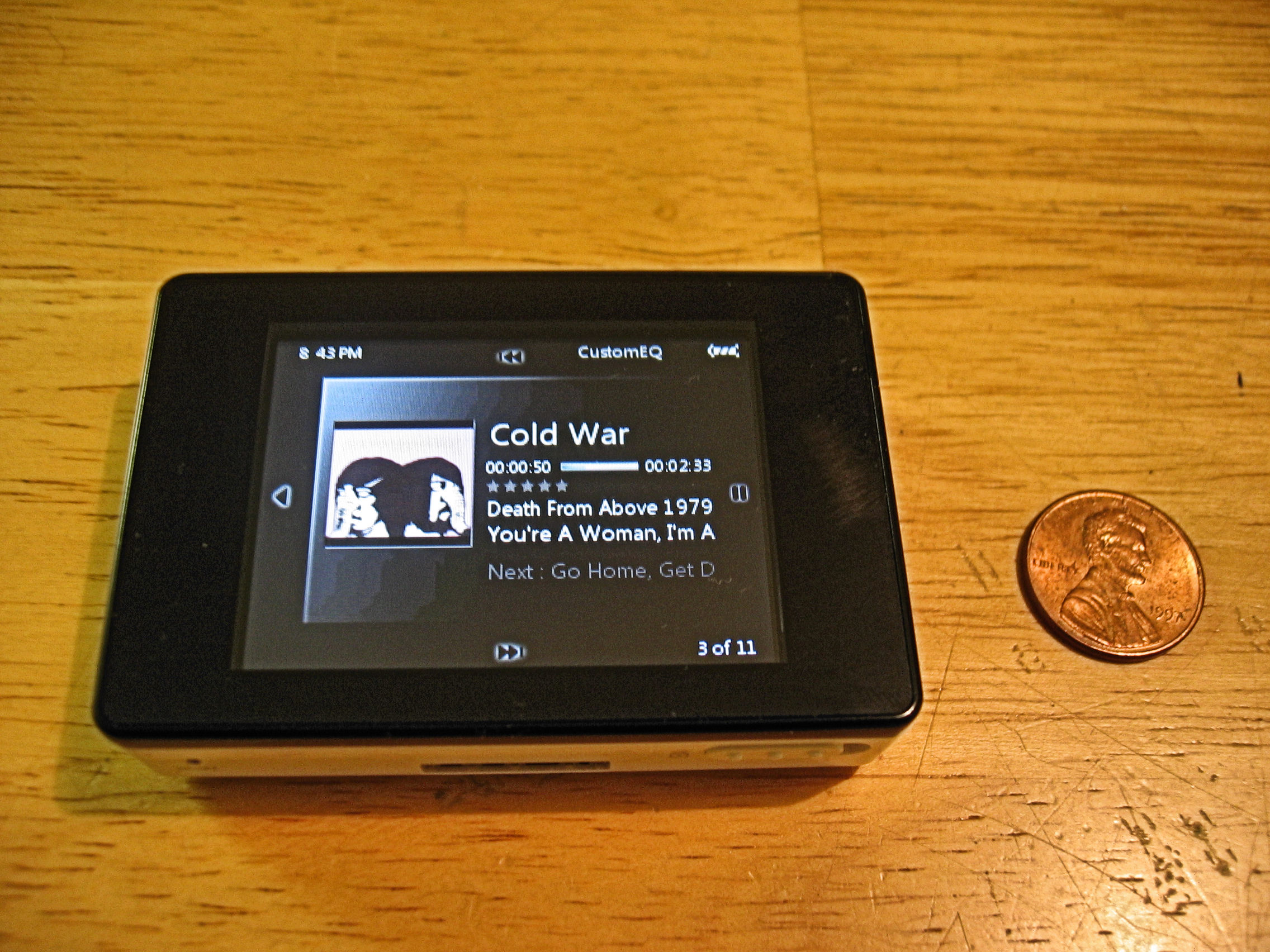
- First generation Clix (2 GB), with a penny coin for scale
- Also known as: U20 (Clix 2)
- Manufacturer: iRiver
- Type: Digital audio player / Micro-sized PMP
- Lifespan: 2005 – 2008
- Media: 512 MB–8 GB flash memory
- Display: 1st gen: 320 × 240 px, 2.2 in (56 mm), color LCD; 2nd gen: 320 × 240 px, 2.2 in (56 mm), color AMOLED; Lplayer: 320 × 240 px, 2 in (51 mm), color LCD
- Input: D-Click
- Connectivity: 1st gen: 3.5 mm headphone jack (TRS), USB 2.0-compliant iriver 18-pin dock connector 2nd gen and Lplayer: 3.5 mm headphone jack (TRS), USB 2.0-compliant Mini USB
- Power: Li-Ion battery
- Successor: iriver Spinn

The iRiver Clix (stylised iriver clix) is a portable media player that was developed and sold by iriver through two generations. The Clix was originally known as the U10, released in 2005. The next year it was revised and essentially rebranded to Clix. A second-generation player, often called the Clix 2, was released in 2007, and later a minor revision called Clix+. The players are navigated by four buttons embedded on its sides, referred to as D-Click.

== U10 ==
iRiver introduced the U10 in June 2005. It was available in capacities of 512MB and 1GB. The player has a 2.2-inch (55 mm) 18-bit (262,144 colors) QVGA (320 x 240) TFT LCD screen covering most of its faceplate. It sits above the buttons, called the D-Click System. It allows the device to be used in a touch sensitive fashion despite it not being touch sensitive. There are also minimal-sized buttons on the sides for power, button lock, volume, and a Pivot key that instantly changes the screen orientation.

The U10 supports audio formats of MP3, WMA (including protected WMA), and Ogg Vorbis. As with some previous iRiver players it includes SRS WOW 3D sound technology. Additionally it also plays content in the MPEG-4 SP video format (other formats are converted with included software), the Unicode text format, and Flash Lite games and animation. There is also a built-in FM tuner and recorder, a microphone and an alarm clock.

An optional docking cradle was also sold for the U10, alongside a remote control. The cradle has stereo speakers, an additional line in input, and a snooze button on the top so that it can be used like an alarm clock.

== Clix ==
In May 2006, the Iriver Clix was introduced. While physically identical to the U10, the Clix had an overhauled user interface with improved performance. It was provided initially in 1 GB and 2 GB capacities and retailed for a lower price than the U10 did. In November 2006, a 4 GB version was released, retailing for $200 in the United States.

The Pivot key was also replaced by the "Smart Key" which is a customisable button that can be assigned by the user to various functions.

iRiver also worked with Microsoft and MTV, offering immediate compatibility with Windows Media Player 11 (then in beta) and MTV's Urge online music service. The Clix is also PlaysForSure certified.

== Clix 2 ==
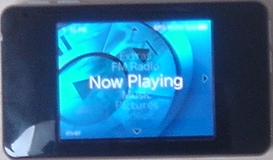
The second generation Clix

iRiver previewed several new players at the 2007 Consumer Electronics Show, including a smaller version of the Clix (the S10), a screenless one (the S7), and a new version of the Clix. In April 2007, the second generation Clix (stylised clix2) was released worldwide in 2 GB, 4 GB and later 8 GB versions. This version is much thinner (12.8 millimetres (0.50 in) instead of 16.4 millimetres (0.65 in)), and its screen is now in AMOLED (Active-matrix organic light-emitting diode), which enables unlimited viewing angles compared to LCDs. It was the world's first multimedia device with an AMOLED display.

In addition, the second generation Clix improved MPEG 4 video support to 30 frames per second. There is also WMV support. The free, Java-based iriverter program can convert most video formats into playable files using the firmware's unofficial support of the XviD 1.1.0 codec.

The 8 GB version of the player was released on 11 July 2007 in South Korea and by September elsewhere. A Red Line version was later released which has a red stripe on its edges. It was released initially in 8 GB but a 4 GB version was also sold. In July 2007, a version called the Clix Rhapsody debuted in the United States, supporting the DRM-based subscription service Rhapsody. The second generation Clix was a key product in the attempt to overturn the company's fortunes.

This new Clix is also highly customisable with support for interface themes, backgrounds and custom TrueType fonts support. It provides MTP or direct access of its UMS filesystem through mini-USB in place of proprietary connectors.

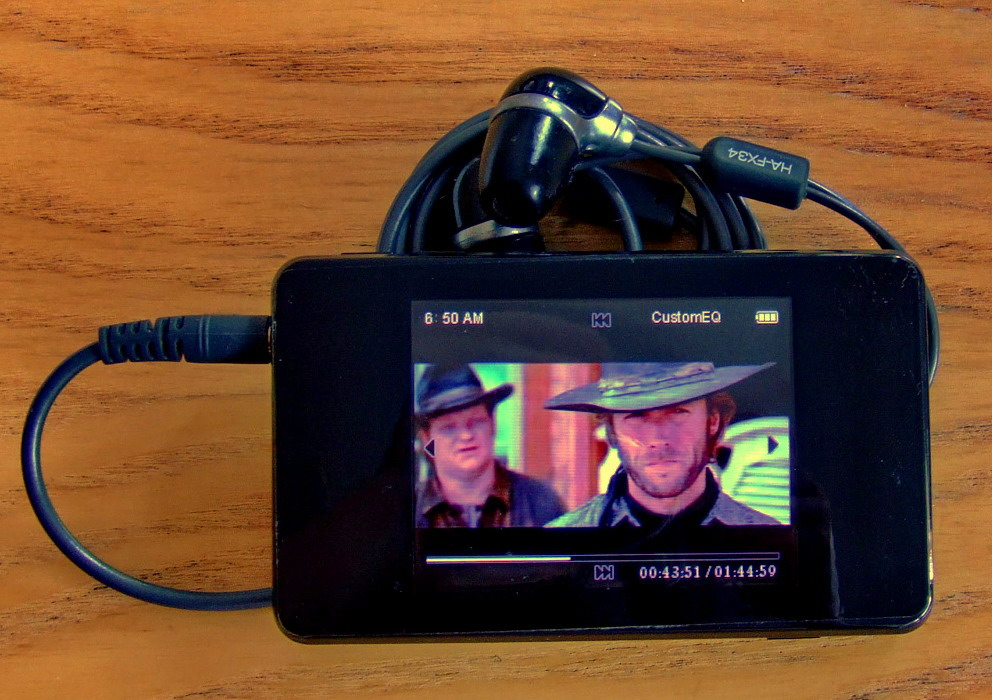
The Clix 2's AMOLED screen playing a movie

=== Clix+ ===
An update to the second generation Clix was released in South Korea in December 2007 which added a DMB receiver. It was also previewed at the 2008 Consumer Electronics Show with a western release announced.

== Lplayer ==
The Lplayer is essentially a smaller version of the Clix and U10. It has a 2-inch display. It was released in 2008.

== Reception ==
Trusted Reviews called the iRiver U10's interface "innovative" and the player generally "feature laden", but criticised high price and difficulty of getting music on it. CNET, with a score of 8.3 out of 10, called it "sleek and stylish" and praised the battery life, but disliked its price, the maximum 1 GB capacity, and lack of album art support.

The original Clix was well received by most reviewers, and became the highest scored MP3 player on CNET with a score of 8.4. CNET called the user interface "excellent" and praised its features. PC Mag UK gave it 4 out of 5, giving praise to design, sound quality and extras, but criticised the lack of pack-in video conversion software and that the D-Click "can be annoying". AnythingButiPod.com commented that the previous U10 was too overpriced, but the Clix is more reasonable while still having improvements. It noted some of its market rivals being the Sansa e200 and the Samsung YP-Z5.

The second generation Clix has been received well by most reviewers. CNET's editorial review, which gave the player an Editor's Choice award, praised its "unique and intuitive interface and stellar audio quality". Calling it the "Nano killer", it scored 8.7 out of 10, dethroning its predecessor to become CNET's highest rated MP3 player. PC Magazine stated that the player had "very good audio and photo quality, long battery life, and a host of extras.". Trusted Reviews, with a score of 4.5 out of 5, called it "possibly the most desirable portable media player", giving praise to the style, screen and sound quality. Computerworld said that the Clix line had evolved into the "ideal media player".

Commonly mentioned disadvantages of the Clix 2 included a lack of included video conversion software, although it later became available for download via iRiver America's site.

=== Sales ===
The second generation Clix, from launch in February 2007 to December 2007, sold about 180,000 units in South Korea.
