= IRiver H10 series =

iRiver H10
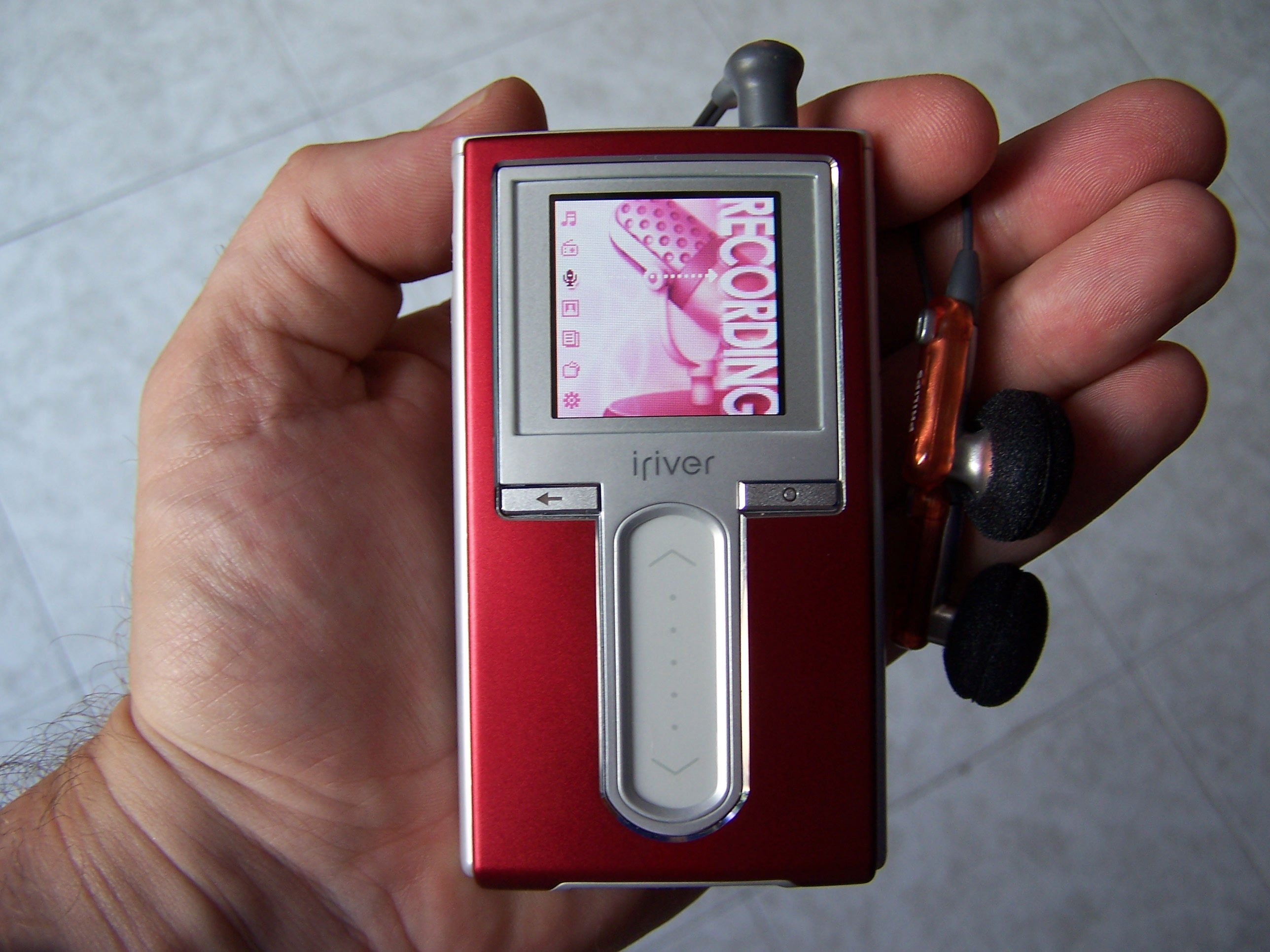
- A red H10 model
- Also known as: H10
- Developer: iriver
- Manufacturer: iriver
- Type: MP3 player
- Lifespan: 2004 – 2006
- CPU: PortalPlayer 5020
- Sound: 3.5mm phone jack
- Predecessor: iriver H300 series
- Successor: iriver E10

The H10 is a series of portable audio players developed by iRiver, coming in multiple capacities and sizes. The player first went on sale in South Korea in December 2004 and rolled out internationally soon afterwards. The H10 series are hard disk based players coming in a 20 gigabyte form, along with smaller variants of 5 or 6 gigabytes. All versions come with a colour screen as well as voice recording and FM radio. Unlike most other iRiver products, the H10 series does not play Ogg Vorbis. However, the device works well with the Rockbox alternative firmware which does play Ogg Vorbis.

== Micro-Hard Drive versions ==
- 5GB or 6GB capacities
- 2.2 x 0.6 x 3.8 inches (96 grams)
- 1.5 inch TFT screen (128 x 128, 260 000 colors)
- Can view TXT and JPEG files
- Supports MP3, WMA, WMA DRM, MPEG 1 Audio, MPEG 2 Audio, and MPEG 2.5 Audio formats
- 90 dB signal-to-noise ratio.
- Lithium-ion rechargeable removable battery rated at 12 hours
- Digital FM tuner (60 dB signal-to-noise ratio)
- Ability to record FM tuner (one preset only)
- FM and voice recorder (built in microphone)
- Line-in/line-out (requires optional cradle)
- USB 2.0 and 1.1 compatible
- MTP version in North America, UMS version in Asia and Europe
- Removable battery
- Available in two colors: dark gray or red (North America)

The Microdrives used in these models does not have the standard CompactFlash II interface.

== 20GB Hard Drive Version ==
Similar to the 5/6GB version, with these key differences

- 20GB capacity (using a Hitachi Travelstar C4K60, model HTC426020G7CE10, the CE indicating that it uses a ZIF connector on the long side of the drive)
- MTP mode only (UMS can be induced by holding the O button and the power button at boot)
- 2.4 x 0.85 x 4 inches (164 grams)
- 1.8 inch TFT screen (160 x 128, 260 000 colors)
- Battery not removable

The 20GB version can be upgraded to 120GB by replacing the hard drive with a Toshiba MK1214GAH.

== H10 Jr ==
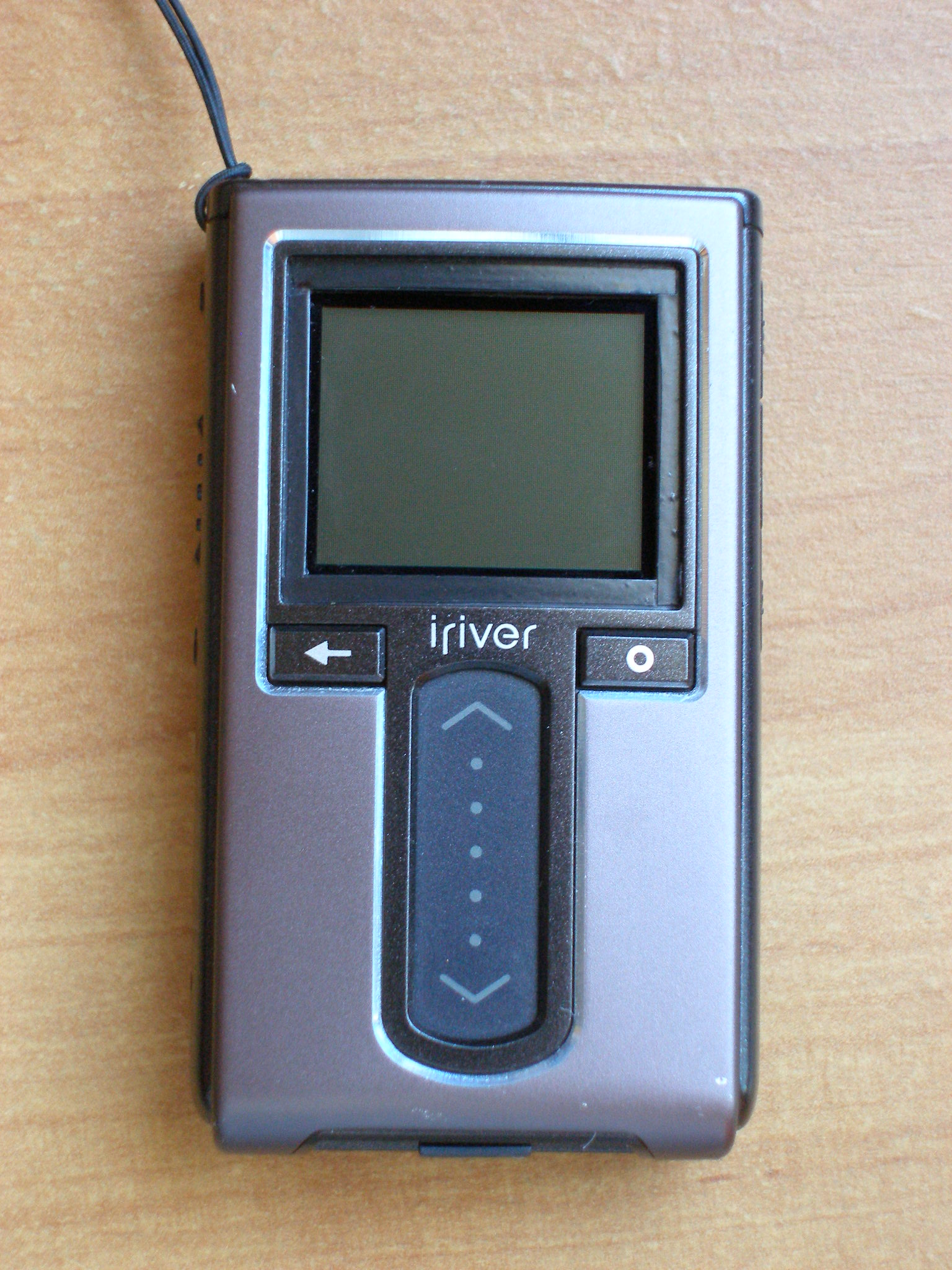
Silver iRiver H10 Jr

The H10 Jr is a smaller player but with the same shape as H10. It comes in 512 MB and 1 GB capacities and still features FM tuner, Voice and FM recording, and a built-in lithium-ion battery.

== Appearances in media ==
A silver H10 (20GB) was used as a detonation device for a bomb in the Season 6 premiere of 24.

== See also ==
- MP3 player
- Rockbox (alternative, open source firmware for the iRiver H10, H100 and H300 series)
