= IRiver iFP series =

Flash memory digital audio players

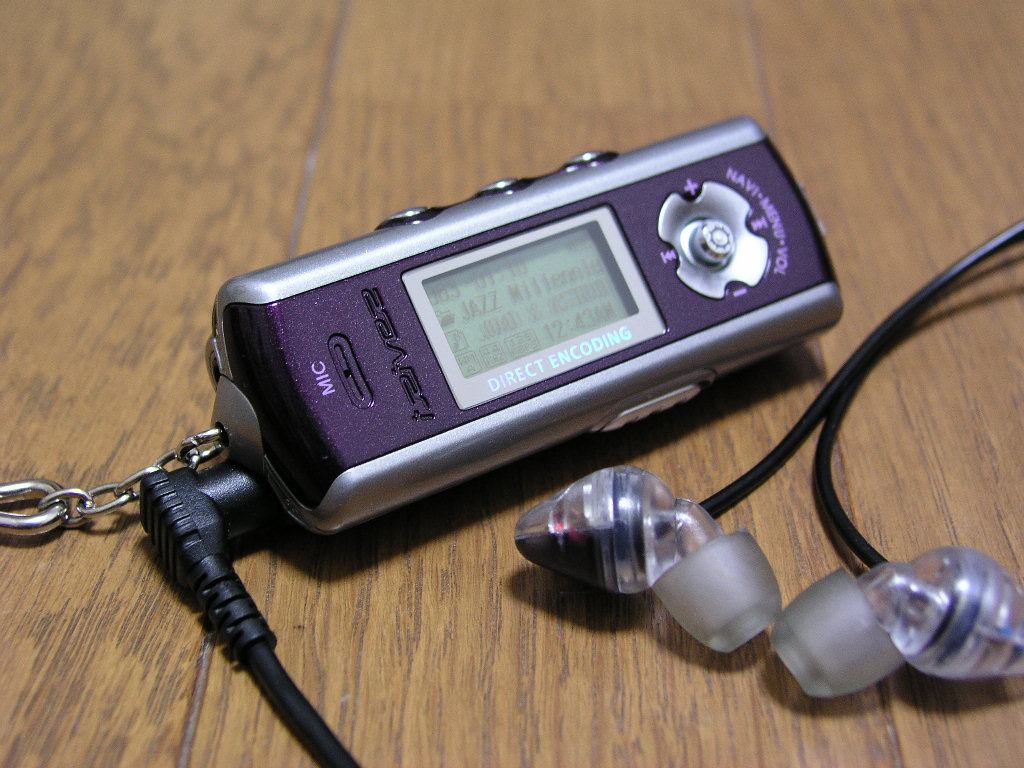
iRiver iFP-799

iRiver iFP was a series of small flash memory digital audio players from iRiver. It started out with the "Prism" iFP-100 series, the company's first ever digital audio player, in 2002. This was followed by six new entries in the line, until its replacement by the iriver T series (the T30 and T10) in 2005.

== Reception ==
The iFP-100 and iFP-300 were successful products. They formed a sort of de facto industry standard and pushed other manufacturers away from expandable memory, in favour of high-capacity flash.

== Specifications and comparison ==
| Series | Year | Model | Capacity | Display | FM radio | Direct Encoding | File type support | Terminals | USB version | Battery type |
|---|---|---|---|---|---|---|---|---|---|---|
| iFP-100 (Prism) | 2002 | iFP-120 | 32 MB | 4-line monochrome with backlight | No | No | MP3, WMA, ASF | proprietary data port, stereo 3.5 mm | 1.1 | AA |
| iFP-100 (Prism) | 2002 | iFP-120T | 32 MB | 4-line monochrome with backlight | Yes | No | MP3, WMA, ASF | proprietary data port, stereo 3.5 mm | 1.1 | AA |
| iFP-100 (Prism) | 2002 | iFP-140 | 64 MB | 4-line monochrome with backlight | No | No | MP3, WMA, ASF | proprietary data port, stereo 3.5 mm | 1.1 | AA |
| iFP-100 (Prism) | 2002 | iFP-140T | 64 MB | 4-line monochrome with backlight | Yes | No | MP3, WMA, ASF | proprietary data port, stereo 3.5 mm | 1.1 | AA |
| iFP-100 (Prism) | 2002 | iFP-180 | 128 MB | 4-line monochrome with backlight | No | No | MP3, WMA, ASF | proprietary data port, stereo 3.5 mm | 1.1 | AA |
| iFP-100 (Prism) | 2002 | iFP-180T | 128 MB | 4-line monochrome with backlight | Yes | No | MP3, WMA, ASF | proprietary data port, stereo 3.5 mm | 1.1 | AA |
| iFP-100 (Prism) | 2002 | iFP-190 | 256 MB | 4-line monochrome with backlight | No | No | MP3, WMA, ASF | proprietary data port, stereo 3.5 mm | 1.1 | AA |
| iFP-100 (Prism) | 2002 | iFP-190T | 256 MB | 4-line monochrome with backlight | Yes | No | MP3, WMA, ASF | proprietary data port, stereo 3.5 mm | 1.1 | AA |
| iFP-100 (Prism) | 2002 | iFP-195 | 512 MB | 4-line monochrome with backlight | No | No | MP3, WMA, ASF | proprietary data port, stereo 3.5 mm | 1.1 | AA |
| iFP-100 (Prism) | 2002 | iFP-195T | 512 MB | 4-line monochrome with backlight | Yes | No | MP3, WMA, ASF | proprietary data port, stereo 3.5 mm | 1.1 | AA |
| iFP-300 (Craft) | 2003 | iFP-340 | 64 MB | 4-line monochrome with backlight | No | No | MP3, WMA, ASF | 4-pin Mini B USB, stereo 3.5 mm, Line in | 1.1 | AA |
| iFP-300 (Craft) | 2003 | iFP-380T | 128 MB | 4-line monochrome with backlight | Yes | Yes | MP3, WMA, ASF | 4-pin Mini B USB, stereo 3.5 mm, Line in | 1.1 | AA |
| iFP-300 (Craft) | 2003 | iFP-390T | 256 MB | 4-line monochrome with backlight | Yes | Yes | MP3, WMA, ASF | 4-pin Mini B USB, stereo 3.5 mm, Line in | 1.1 | AA |
| iFP-300 (Craft) | 2003 | iFP-395T | 512 MB | 4-line monochrome with backlight | Yes | Yes | MP3, WMA, ASF | 4-pin Mini B USB, stereo 3.5 mm, Line in | 1.1 | AA |
| iFP-500 (MasterPiece) | 2003 | iFP-590 | 256 MB | 4-line monochrome with backlight | Yes | Yes | MP3, WMA, ASF | 4-pin Mini B USB, stereo 3.5 mm, Line in | 1.1 | Lithium-ion (built in) |
| iFP-500 (MasterPiece) | 2003 | iFP-595 | 512 MB | 4-line monochrome with backlight | Yes | Yes | MP3, WMA, ASF | 4-pin Mini B USB, stereo 3.5 mm, Line in | 1.1 | Lithium-ion (built in) |
| iFP-500 (MasterPiece) | 2003 | iFP-599 | 1 GB | 4-line monochrome with backlight | Yes | Yes | MP3, WMA, ASF | 4-pin Mini B USB, stereo 3.5 mm, Line in | 1.1 | Lithium-ion (built in) |
| iFP-700 (Craft II) | 2004 | iFP-780 | 128 MB | 4-line monochrome with backlight | Yes | Yes | MP3, WMA, ASF, OGG Vorbis | 4-pin Mini B USB, stereo 3.5 mm, Line in | 1.1 | AA |
| iFP-700 (Craft II) | 2004 | iFP-790 | 256 MB | 4-line monochrome with backlight | Yes | Yes | MP3, WMA, ASF, OGG Vorbis | 4-pin Mini B USB, stereo 3.5 mm, Line in | 2.0 | AA |
| iFP-700 (Craft II) | 2004 | iFP-795 | 512 MB | 4-line monochrome with backlight | Yes | Yes | MP3, WMA, ASF, OGG Vorbis | 4-pin Mini B USB, stereo 3.5 mm, Line in | 2.0 | AA |
| iFP-700 (Craft II) | 2004 | iFP-799 | 1 GB | 4-line monochrome with backlight | Yes | Yes | MP3, WMA, ASF, OGG Vorbis | 4-pin Mini B USB, stereo 3.5 mm, Line in | 2.0 | AA |
| iFP-800 (Craft II) | 2004 | iFP-880 | 128 MB | 4-line monochrome with backlight | Yes | Yes | MP3, WMA, ASF, OGG Vorbis | 4-pin Mini B USB, stereo 3.5 mm, Line in | 1.1 | AA |
| iFP-800 (Craft II) | 2004 | iFP-890 | 256 MB | 4-line monochrome with backlight | Yes | Yes | MP3, WMA, ASF, OGG Vorbis | 4-pin Mini B USB, stereo 3.5 mm, Line in | 2.0 | AA |
| iFP-800 (Craft II) | 2004 | iFP-895 | 512 MB | 4-line monochrome with backlight | Yes | Yes | MP3, WMA, ASF, OGG Vorbis | 4-pin Mini B USB, stereo 3.5 mm, Line in | 2.0 | AA |
| iFP-800 (Craft II) | 2004 | iFP-899 | 1 GB | 4-line monochrome with backlight | Yes | Yes | MP3, WMA, ASF, OGG Vorbis | 4-pin Mini B USB, stereo 3.5 mm, Line in | 2.0 | AA |
| iFP-900 (MasterPiece II) | 2004 | iFP-990 | 256 MB | Colour LCD with backlight | Yes | Yes | MP3, WMA, ASF, OGG Vorbis | 4-pin Mini B USB, stereo 3.5 mm, Line in | 2.0 | Lithium-ion (built in) |
| iFP-900 (MasterPiece II) | 2004 | iFP-995 | 512 MB | Colour LCD with backlight | Yes | Yes | MP3, WMA, ASF, OGG Vorbis | 4-pin Mini B USB, stereo 3.5 mm, Line in | 2.0 | Lithium-ion (built in) |
| iFP-900 (MasterPiece II) | 2004 | iFP-999 | 1 GB | Colour LCD with backlight | Yes | Yes | MP3, WMA, ASF, OGG Vorbis | 4-pin Mini B USB, stereo 3.5 mm, Line in | 2.0 | Lithium-ion (built in) |
| iFP-1000 (Prism Eye) | 2004 | iFP-1090 | 256 MB | Colour LCD with backlight | Yes | Yes | MP3, WMA, ASF, OGG Vorbis | 4-pin Mini B USB, stereo 3.5 mm, Line in | 2.0 | Lithium-ion (removable) |
| iFP-1000 (Prism Eye) | 2004 | iFP-1095 | 512 MB | Colour LCD with backlight | Yes | Yes | MP3, WMA, ASF, OGG Vorbis | 4-pin Mini B USB, stereo 3.5 mm, Line in | 2.0 | Lithium-ion (removable) |
