= IRiver X20 =

Portable media player

iRiver X20
- Manufacturer: iRiver
- Type: Digital Audio Player / Portable Media Player
- Released: March 2007
- Media: 2–8 GB flash memory
- Display: 320 × 240 px (QVGA), 2.2 in (56 mm), color TFT LCD
- Input: Mechanical scroll wheel
- Connectivity: 3.5 mm headphone jack + line-in jack, Mini USB input
- Predecessor: iRiver Clix 2

The iRiver X20 is a small, flash memory based portable media player (PMP) from iRiver. It was announced at the 2007 Consumer Electronics Show. Initially only 2 and 4 GB versions were announced but soon an 8 GB was also released.

== Features ==
The X20 is a small device in gloss black with audio and video capability, and also has built-in stereo speakers on its back. Additionally, it has a microSD slot for expandable memory while also offering recording capabilities via microphone in or line in. It has a mechanical scroll wheel that is used for navigating the device, which can only be used in a landscape format with the controls on the right hand side. The X20 also includes a voice recorder and FM radio.

Audio formats supported are MP3, WMA, WAV and OGG. Video formats are MPEG-4 and WMV, and there is also support for JPEG still images.

== Reception ==
According to TechDigest.tv, the iRiver X20 performs well as a music player but the screen is too small for video. It also criticised the interface navigation and gave the player 3 stars out of 5. CNET praised the sleek design and display quality, but was not fond of the mechanical scroll wheel.
