= IRiver Spinn =

iRiver Spinn (U30)
- Also known as: U30
- Manufacturer: iRiver
- Type: PMP
- Released: August 2008
- Media: 4–16 GB flash memory
- CPU: Telechips TCC7901
- Display: 480 × 272 px, 3.2 in (81 mm), color AMOLED, touchscreen
- Input: SPINN System, Touch
- Connectivity: 3.5 mm jack, Properietary data/power USB cable
- Power: Li-Ion battery
- Predecessor: iRiver Clix 2

The iRiver Spinn (stylised iriver SPINN) is a portable media player that was developed and sold by iRiver. It was announced at the 2008 Consumer Electronics Show and shipped later that year. It was a successor to the iRiver Clix 2.

== Features ==
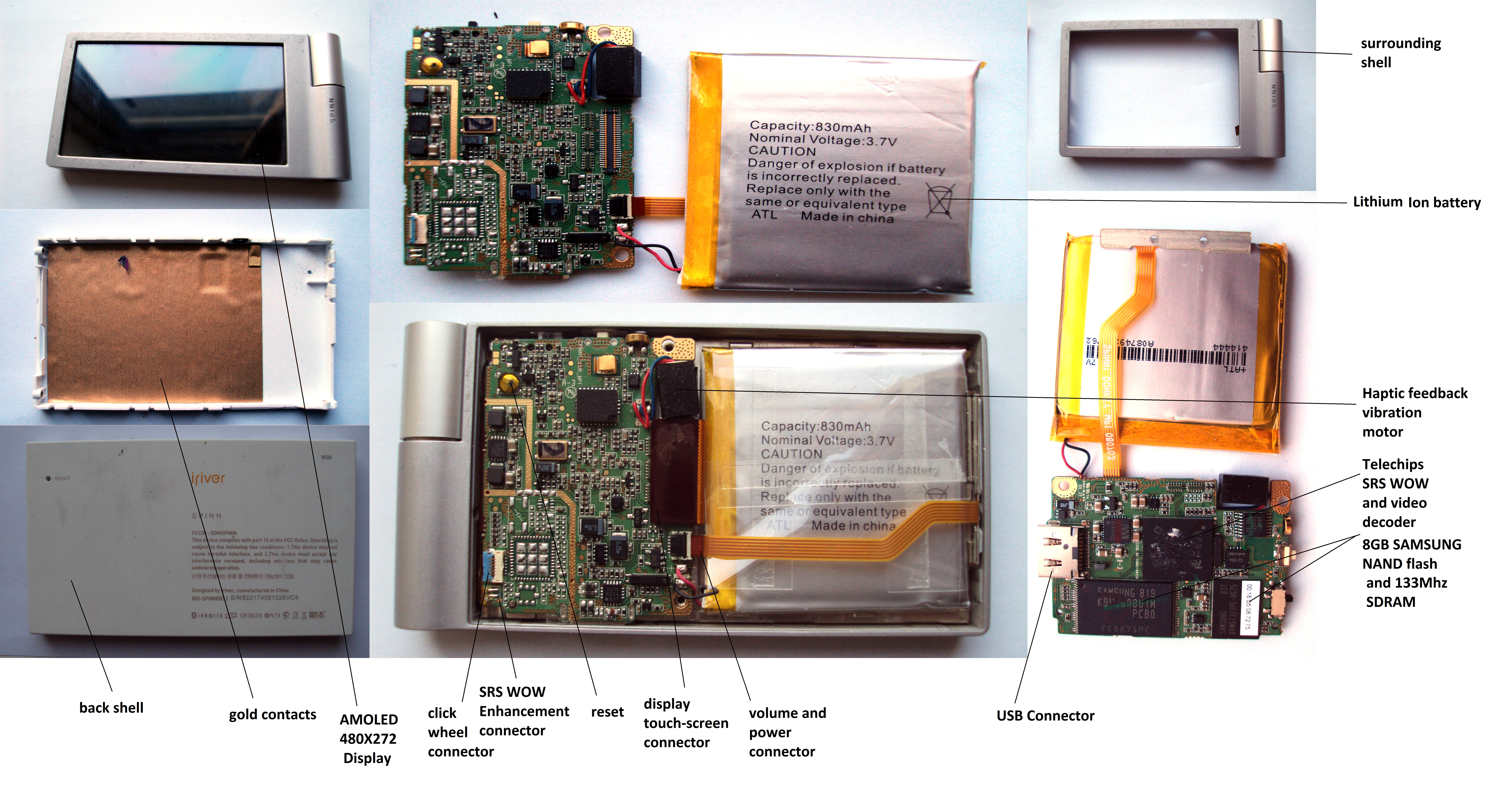
The hardware and internals of a SPINN

The Spinn is fully made of metal and features a resistive touchscreen AMOLED display along with an analogue wheel knob. Both the screen and the wheel have haptic feedback.

The Spinn has sound customisability in the SRS WOW HD 3D, as was seen previously on the iRiver Lplayer. Some features have been carried over including a voice recorder and Flash Lite games, but the Spinn also has Bluetooth. iRiver officially rates a 25 hour battery life for audio, or 5 hours for video.

In some regions such as the UK, it came with a DAB radio tuner.

== Formats ==
It supports the audio formats MP3, WMA, Ogg, APE, ASF and FLAC, and videos in the formats MPEG 4 Simple Profile and WMV.

== Interface ==
The iRiver Spinn's distinct feature is its user operability. It has a modern user interface that can be both operated by both the touchscreen or the physical analogue spindle, which is officially called the SPINN System (Analog Toggle Wheel). The wheel lets the user navigate left and right, and it can be clicked to select.

== Reception ==
Trusted Reviews thought that the Spinn was "excellent and innovative", but that it could be niche in the market. The Register commented that it provides good sound quality as with previous iRiver players, but that it lacks in the video department and that the UI is "half-baked". The CNET review (with a score of 7 out of 10) liked the build quality, interface and support for audio codecs, but criticised the high price and the lack of certain features for the price. Engadget liked the "beautiful" hardware design, the display and the wheel, but did not like the high price and the software. In What Hi-Fi?'s review, the Spinn's design was praised but otherwise commented that for listening to music other products were better.
