= SRS Labs =

American audio technology company

SRS Labs, Inc.
- Type: Subsidiary
- Industry: Audio technology Audio engineering
- Predecessor: Year unknown: previous unit of Hughes
- Founded: 1993; 33 years ago
- Defunct: 2012; 14 years ago
- Fate: Acquired by DTS, Inc., merged, then dissolved
- Headquarters: Santa Ana, California, United States
- Area served: Worldwide
- Key people: Tom Yuen (Chairman and CEO)
- Parent: DTS, Inc.
- Subsidiaries: SRSWOWcast
- Website: www.srslabs.com at the Wayback Machine (archived February 1, 2008)

SRS Labs, Inc. was a Santa Ana, California-based audio technology engineering company that specialized in audio enhancement solutions for wide variety of consumer electronic devices. Originally a part of Hughes Aircraft Company, the audio division developed the Sound Retrieval System technology, and in 1993 was separated off to form SRS Labs, Inc. In 1996 SRS Labs became a publicly traded company on Nasdaq, SRSL.

The company developed audio enhancement solutions and licensed those products to companies including Microsoft, Samsung Group, LG Group, Toshiba, Vizio, Dell, Hewlett-Packard, Sony, ViewSonic, Sharp Corporation, Haier, and Hisense.

In 2008, approximately 36 million SRS-equipped flat-panel TVs were shipped, representing an estimated 30 percent market share.

SRS Labs had more than 300 electronics manufacturing partners, and more than 150 patents for its technologies. SRS manufactured its own products, including MyVolume - Volume Leveling Adaptor, SRS iWOW for iTunes, SRS Audio Sandbox for PC, and SRS iWOW Adaptor for iPod.

In 2012, SRS Labs was acquired by DTS, Inc. and operated as a subsidiary. It was later fully absorbed into the DTS parent company.

== Products ==
The company licensed and produced a number of products including:

- TruVolume
- StudioSound HD
- TruSurround HD
- TruSurround XT
- TheaterSound (Equipped only on high-end Samsung 2010 Televisions.(Series 6 and above) and Samsung 2011 Televisions.(Series 5 and below)
- TheaterSound HD (Equipped only on high-end Samsung 2011 Televisions.(Series 6 and above) and T27A950 3D TV monitor.)
- Headphone 360
- TruSurround HD4
- TruBass
- Dialog Clarity
- WOW
- WOW HD
- TruMedia (for Android devices based on Qualcomm MS7x27 series)
- Circle Surround
- CS Headphone
- CS Auto

== See also ==
- Sound Retrieval System
- DTS (sound system)
