= IRiver =

South Korean consumer electronics company

iRiver
- Native name: 아이리버
- Industry: Consumer electronics
- Founded: January 1999; 27 years ago
- Number of locations: 3 (2016)
- Parent: Dreamus
- Website: www.iriver.co.kr

iRiver, stylized IRIVER and formerly as iriver, is a South Korean consumer electronics division owned by Dreamus which markets music and other accessories in its domestic market.

The company, then officially known as ReignCom, was created in 1999 by seven former Samsung executives, initially releasing portable CD players and later widely known in the 2000s for a line of digital audio players and other portable media devices. In 2019, the company was rebranded as Dreamus.

== History ==
2001-2005 logo

In 1999, Duk-Jun Yang and Rae-Hwan Lee left Samsung Electronics, along with five colleagues. They formed ReignCom, with Yang as CEO, originally as a semiconductor distributor, then decided to capitalize on the growing MP3 player market. They decided to outsource manufacturing to AV Chaseway, in Shenzhen, China, and contract product design to INNO Design, an industrial design company in Palo Alto, California, while keeping R&D in-house.

The company's first iRiver product was the iMP-100, a portable CD player capable of decoding MP3 data files on CDs, released in November 2000. It and a later model, the iMP-250, were rebranded and sold by SONICblue in the United States under the Rio Volt name. iRiver sold later models with its own SlimX brand, billing them as the thinnest MP3 CD players in the world. By now, iRiver portable CD players had achieved high domestic popularity and were also popular elsewhere. iRiver was one of a number of South Korean companies who were dominating the worldwide MP3 industry in these early years.

=== 2002–2005 ===
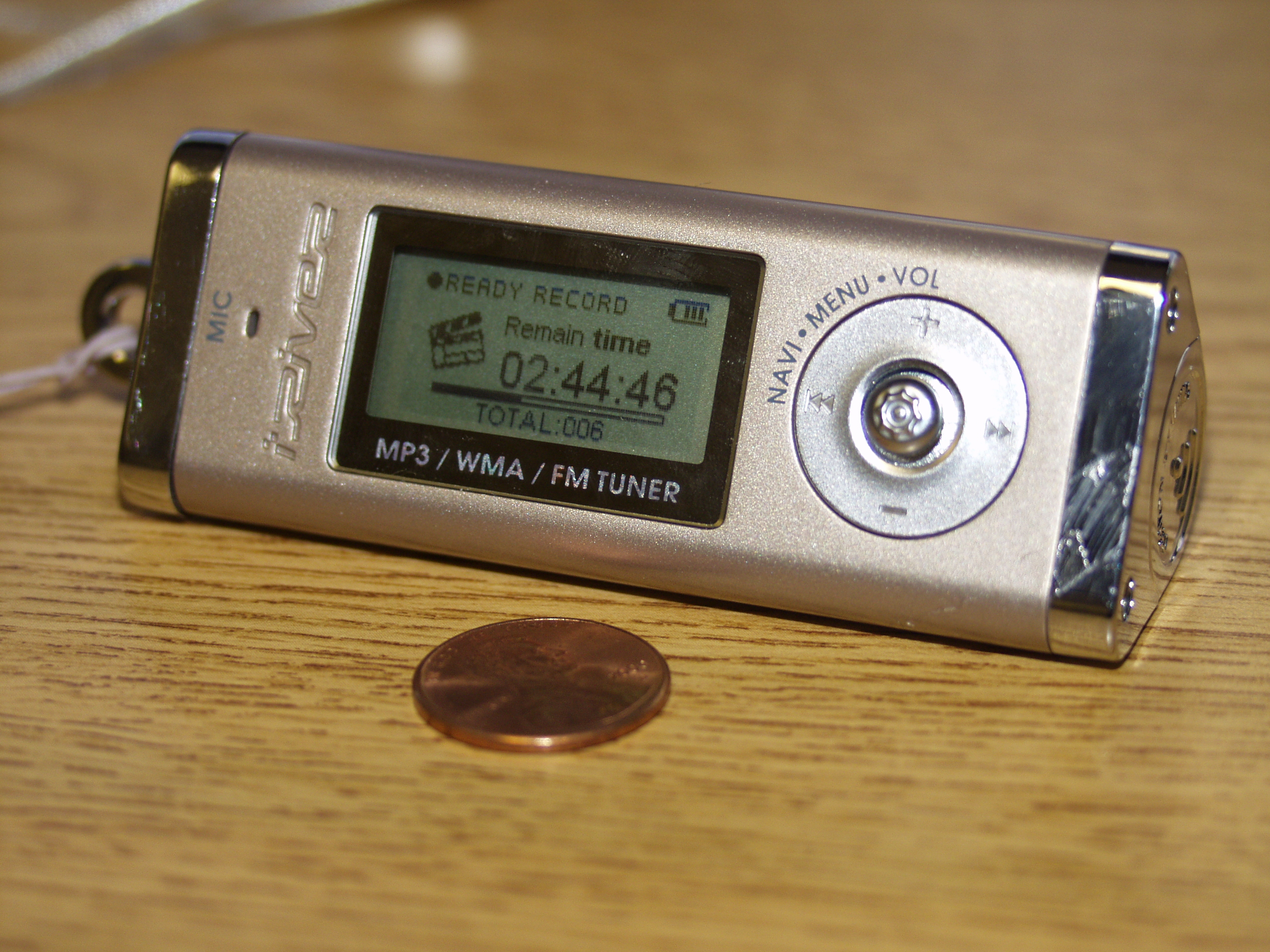
an iRiver iFP-180T, one of its first flash memory music players

In 2002, iRiver scrambled to develop its first flash memory player to meet demand from the U.S. Best Buy chain. This led to the release of their first DAP product, the iFP-100 "Prism" - named as such because of its distinctive shape designed by its design firm partner, INNO Design. By the end of the year, iRiver had already gained as much as 20% of the domestic market and was steadily increasing popularity in foreign markets. A year later, it was first to market with 512 MB and 1 GB flash players with its iFP-500 "Masterpiece" player. It had also completed its IPO at KOSDAQ, a Korean stock exchange. The company was also selling hard drive players to compete with the iPod: the iHP-300 followed by the H300.

iRiver rose to the No. 1 position in the global market of flash players. Its global market share overall was 14.1% in 2003, while Apple led with 21.6%. The marketing of iRiver America was mostly spent on PR and brand partnerships, featuring celebrities such as Ice Cube and Snoop Dogg.

2004-2010 logo

By 2004, iRiver had gained solid market share in the digital audio player market in both the United States and Japan, and sold a total of 2.8 million players worldwide, of which 1.7 million was in the overseas market. During this time, the company went through a rebranding, including changing the styling of its name from iRiver to iriver, and using a ruby-red themed logo in place of blue. It also used adult film star Jenna Jameson and an Audrey Hepburn lookalike as spokesmodels promoting its products.

In 2005, the company decided to focus entirely on flash players like the H10, and the development of jukeboxes (except from the 20 GB version of the H10) was stopped as a result. The launch of Apple's iPod Shuffle hurt iriver sales and it dropped from the top ranking in flash-based players. iriver adopted a new marketing strategy in 2005, attempting to grab mindshare from Apple. It referred to the U10 flash player as the thumb thing. This referred to users controlling their MP3 devices with their thumbs, just as they do their cell phones and text messaging devices. The company also announced plans for digital audio players featuring Internet telephony.

iRiver's U.S. unit, based in Vancouver, Washington, held 3.4% of the U.S. MP3 player market in 2005, according to IDC; this was down from a peak of 13%. The company targeted early adopters among American users as it tried to regain dominance of the category. It also opened sales divisions in Brazil, Germany, Hong Kong and Japan. iRiver's parent Reigncom made significant financial losses by the end of 2005.

=== 2006–2010 ===
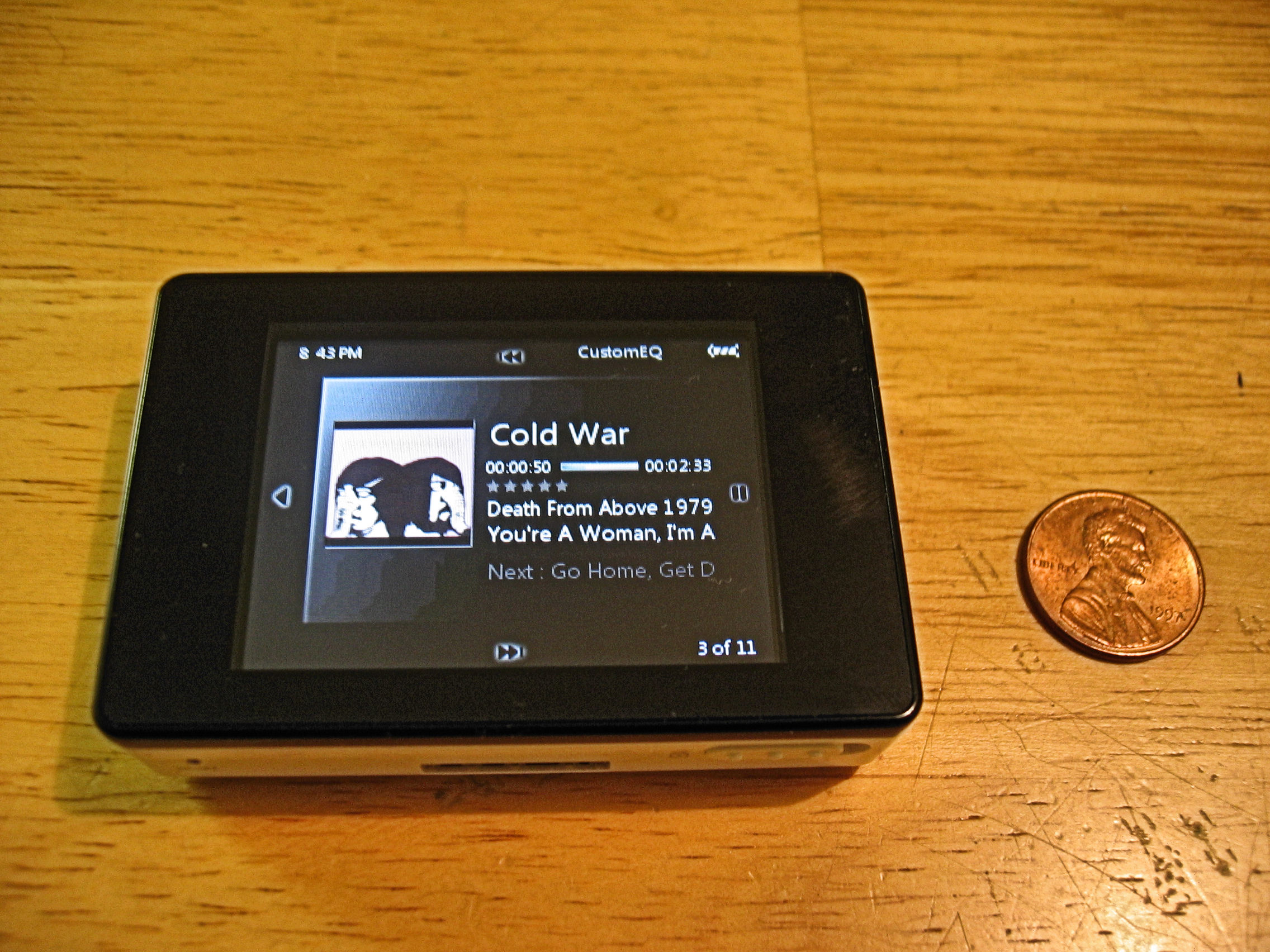
The iRiver clix

ReignCom announced in May 2006 that it would adjust its focus toward hand-held mobile gaming and other electronics, publicly reporting its intentions of quitting the PMP market. It has also reported sluggish sales for its music player business, including a loss of 35.58 billion won (US$36.68 million) in 2005, compared with a net profit of 43.46 billion won in 2004. In its South Korean home market, iRiver once accounted for 50% of sales and the company has bought ads claiming its products are a symbol of patriotism. It has also operated a small chain of iRiver Zone stores, with locations in Korea, Japan, and China. The Incheon International Airport shop features a large heart-shaped art piece, which represents the corporate "Heartbeat Philosophy" of "dedication to its customers". Its European market share had dropped to 0.4% in 2006, down from 1.3% the year prior, and it had also fallen in Japan and the US.

In 2006, the company had sales of 149.5 billion won and an operating loss of 54.4 billion won. The next year, until 2014, South Korean private equity firm Vogo Fund held a large stake in iRiver, which reported 5.5 billion won in profits on 206.8 billion won of sales, working to improve the company's prospects as its MP3 player business has dwindled. Deep losses followed in 2009 and 2010.

In May 2007, Reigncom announced a new division, Reigncom USA, to manage the iriver brand in the United States and help develop new products. The company also bought the Siren brand in Japan from A-MAX Japan, despite protests from Siren Inc. itself.

In 2009, its parent company renamed itself to iRiver. The brand expanded to other products including the Dicple series of electronic dictionaries in South Korea and the iRiver Story e-book reader.

=== 2011–present ===
The iRiver Story reader was released in 2010 and was followed by the Cover Story. The Story HD successor was launched in 2011 which was also iriver's first e-book reader in the American market. That same year, iriver launched its first Android smartphone and tablet in the domestic market.

iRiver was sold to SK Telecom in 2014.

In 2013, iRiver launched the premium brand of Astell & Kern. As the digital music player market had changed, Astell & Kern consisted of premium products instead of iriver's older conventional players.

In 2019, the iRiver company changed its name to Dreamus.

== Products ==
=== Digital audio players ===
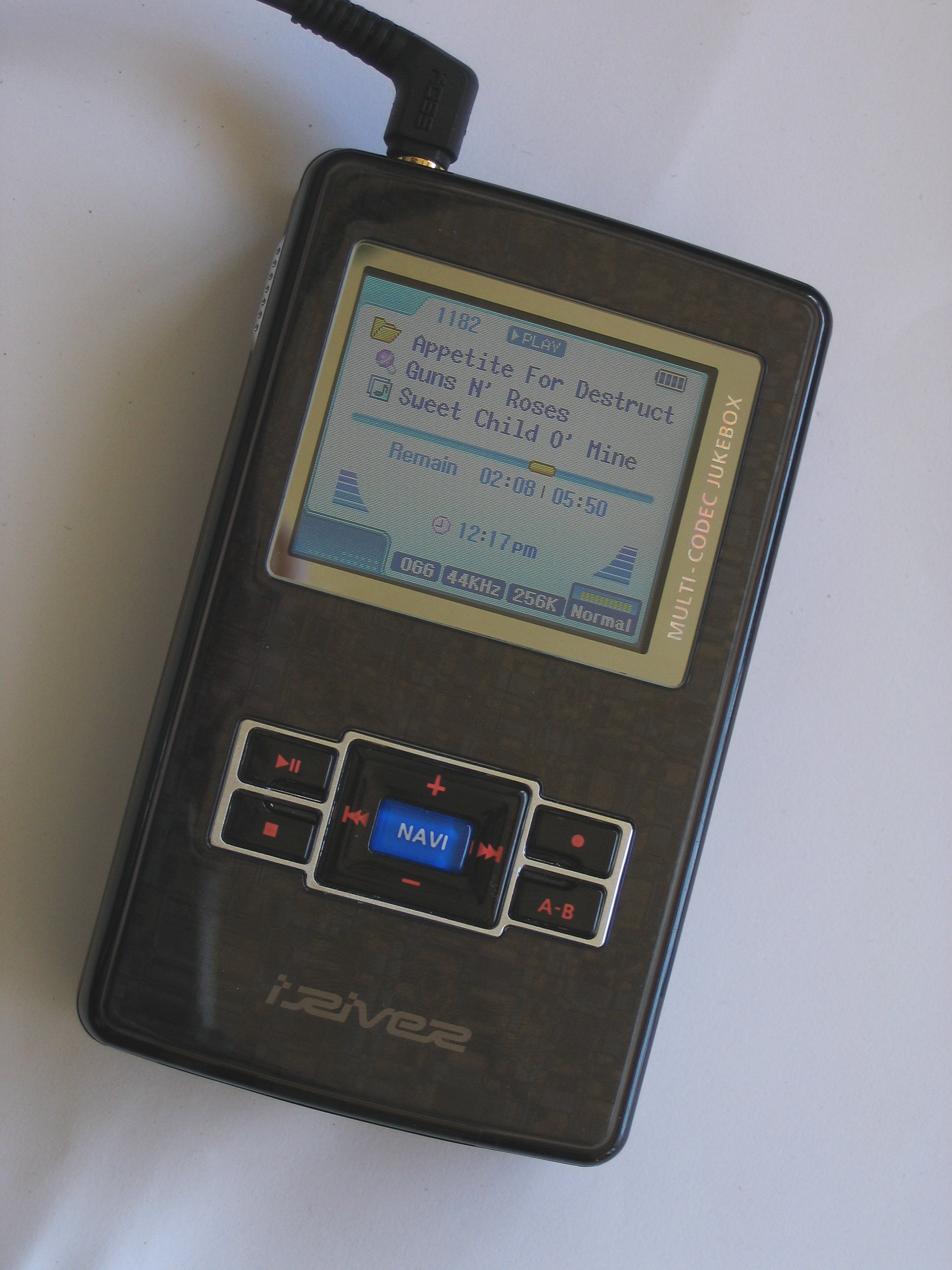
40GB iRiver H340 player from 2004

iriver's products can all play MP3 and WMA audio files. Some units support text viewing, Ogg Vorbis audio files, Macromedia Flash, and/or BMP files. The company also supported Microsoft PlaysForSure, which allowed some products to support subscription-based music download services, including URGE, Napster, Rhapsody, and Yahoo! Music Unlimited. It also let users disable its DRM functionality.

Many players support multilingual display. They support Winamp playlists and allow repeat, shuffle play and programmable functions. Several preset and one user-defined EQ settings are included, plus a built-in FM tuner. A nearly unique feature of some iriver players was the direct MP3-recording capability with selectable bitrate of internal (FM, microphone) and external (line) sources.

Most iRiver players include a unique feature called study mode. Users can quickly jump back and forth within tracks by a certain time interval, set from three to 180 seconds in current models. The option was designed to help people listening to recorded language lessons. SonicBlue removed this feature from its rebranded Rio Volt models, causing some users to hack their players with iRiver firmware from other regions.

Initially connecting devices to the computer for music transfer required the iRiver Music Manager. In later firmwares UMS is supported so that the computer's native file explorer could be used to transfer files. Iriver eventually dropped UMS support for the U10, T30, T20 and T10 models in favor of Microsoft's MTP. The company later released an official Firmware Updater that allows users to switch between the MTP and UMS interfaces.

==== Hard disk based ====
- iGP series
  - iGP-100 (1.5 GB) USB 2.0 connectivity. Plays MP3, WMA, ASF, and Ogg Vorbis files. UMS. Built in lithium-ion battery. Released in 2003.
- H/iHP series
  - H10: (5 GB, 6 GB, 20 GB—except Asia), available in four different colors (red, blue, silver and grey), 16-bit color screen, can record from Radio, Internal Microphone (Voice) or Line-In (Line in only with extra cradle). The 5 GB and 6 GB models are around the size of the iPod mini and are composed mainly of aluminum. The navigation is done with a touchpad designed by iriver. These devices cannot play Ogg Vorbis files. PlaysForSure and UMS.
  - iHP-100 series: (10 GB, 15 GB, 20 GB, 40 GB) Voice, line in and FM recording. Optical in and out. Built in lithium-polymer battery. UMS. USB 2.0 connectivity.
  - H300 series: (20 GB, 40 GB) PlaysForSure and UMS. Built in lithium-polymer battery. Transfer with certain Digital Cameras. Voice, line in and FM recording. Plays video with Korean firmware. USB 2.0 connectivity.
- E series
  - E10: (6 GB) Similar interface to that of the U10 series. The device also features a remote control for TV. PlaysForSure and UMS are supported. The device allows flash files to be played, videos and FM radio. It contains recording capabilities for both voice and FM radio. Released 2006 in Japan and South Korea, elsewhere in 2007.

==== Flash memory based ====
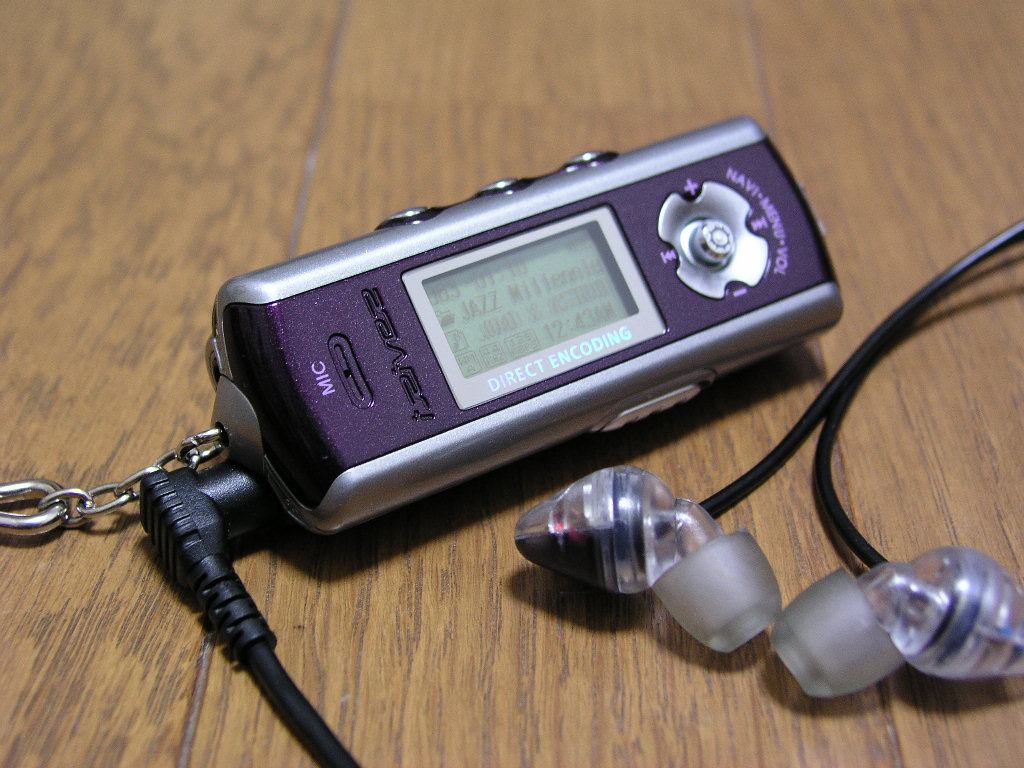
1GB iriver iFP-799 player from 2004

- iFP series
  - iFP-100 (Prism): (32 MB, 64 MB, 128 MB, 256 MB, 512 MB) Prism shaped. USB 1.1 connectivity (four-pin mini-B plug). Plays MP3, WMA and WAV files. Prism shaped. MTP (UMS upgradable).
  - iFP-300 (Craft I): (64 MB, 128 MB, 256 MB, 512 MB) Prism shaped. USB 1.1 connectivity. UMS. FM tuner. Voice, line in, and FM recording.
  - iFP-500 (MasterPiece I): (256 MB, 512 MB, 1 GB) Soap bar shaped. USB 1.1 connectivity. UMS. FM tuner. Built in lithium-ion battery. Voice, line in and FM recording.
  - iFP-700 (Craft II): (128 MB, 256 MB, 512 MB, 1 GB, 4 GB) Prism Shaped with rounded edges. USB 2.0 connectivity. UMS. FM tuner. Voice, line in and FM recording.
  - iFP-800 (Craft II): (128 MB, 256 MB, 512 MB, 1 GB) Prism-shaped with rounded edges. USB 2.0 connectivity. UMS. FM tuner. Voice, line in and FM recording.
  - iFP-900 (MasterPiece II): (256 MB, 512 MB, 1 GB) Soap bar-shaped. Color 1.2" LCD. FM tuner. Voice, line in and FM recording. USB 2.0 connectivity. UMS. Built-in lithium-ion battery.
  - iFP-1000 (Prism Eye): (256 MB, 512 MB) 0.3 megapixel digital camera built in, prism shaped, color screen. USB 2.0 connectivity. UMS. Removable lithium-ion battery.
- N series - necklace type
  - N10: (128 MB, 256 MB, 512 MB, 1 GB) "medallion style" — worn hanging from the neck. USB 2.0 connectivity. UMS. Released in 2004.
  - N11: (128 MB, 256 MB, 512 MB, 1 GB) "medallion style" — worn hanging from the neck. Features longer battery life than N10. USB 2.0 connectivity. UMS. Built in lithium-ion battery. OLED screen.
  - N12: (1 GB, 2 GB) "medallion style" — worn hanging from the neck. Released in South Korea in 2006.
  - N15 (Jewel): (2 GB, 4 GB)
  - N20
  - N20S
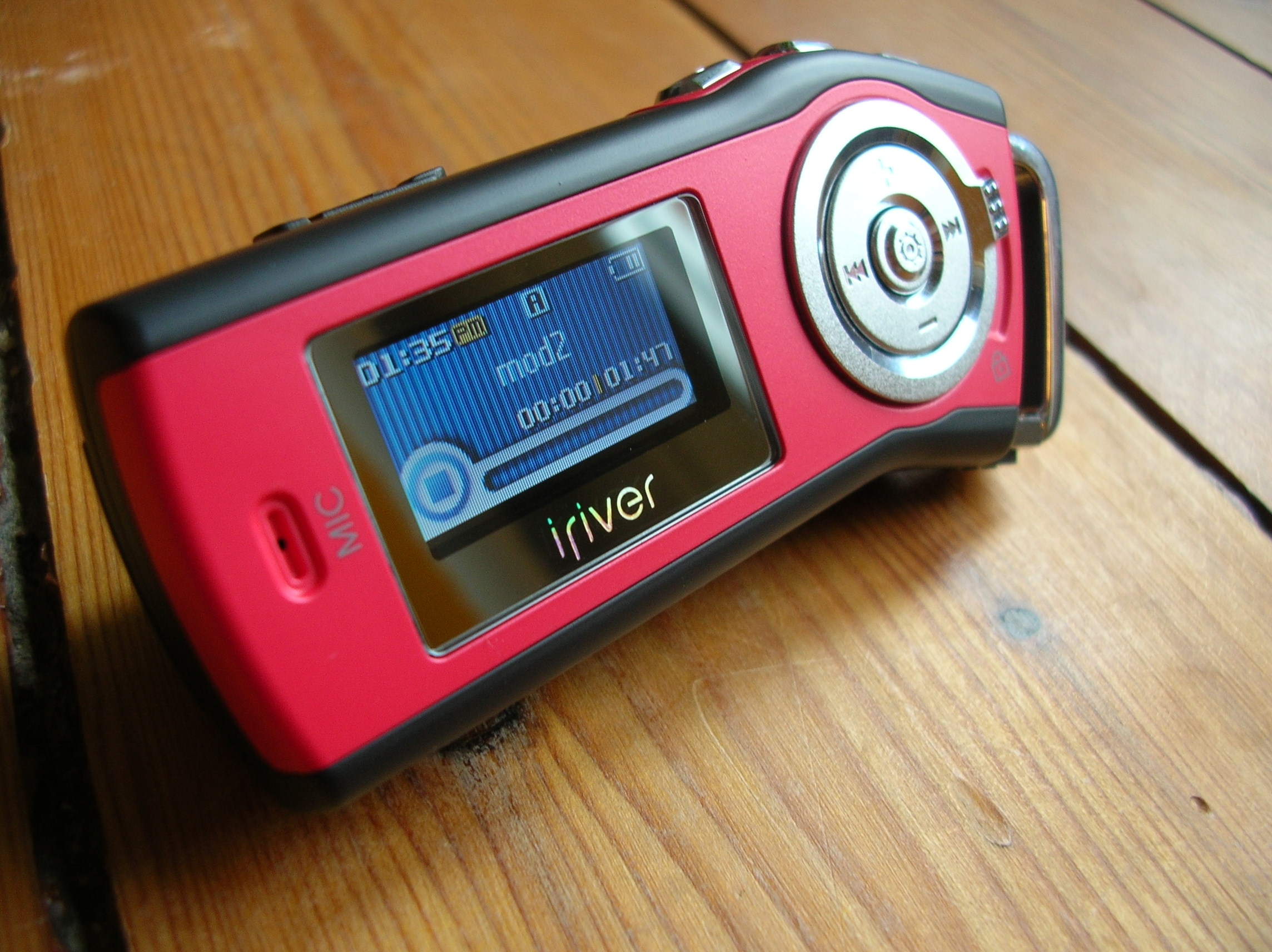
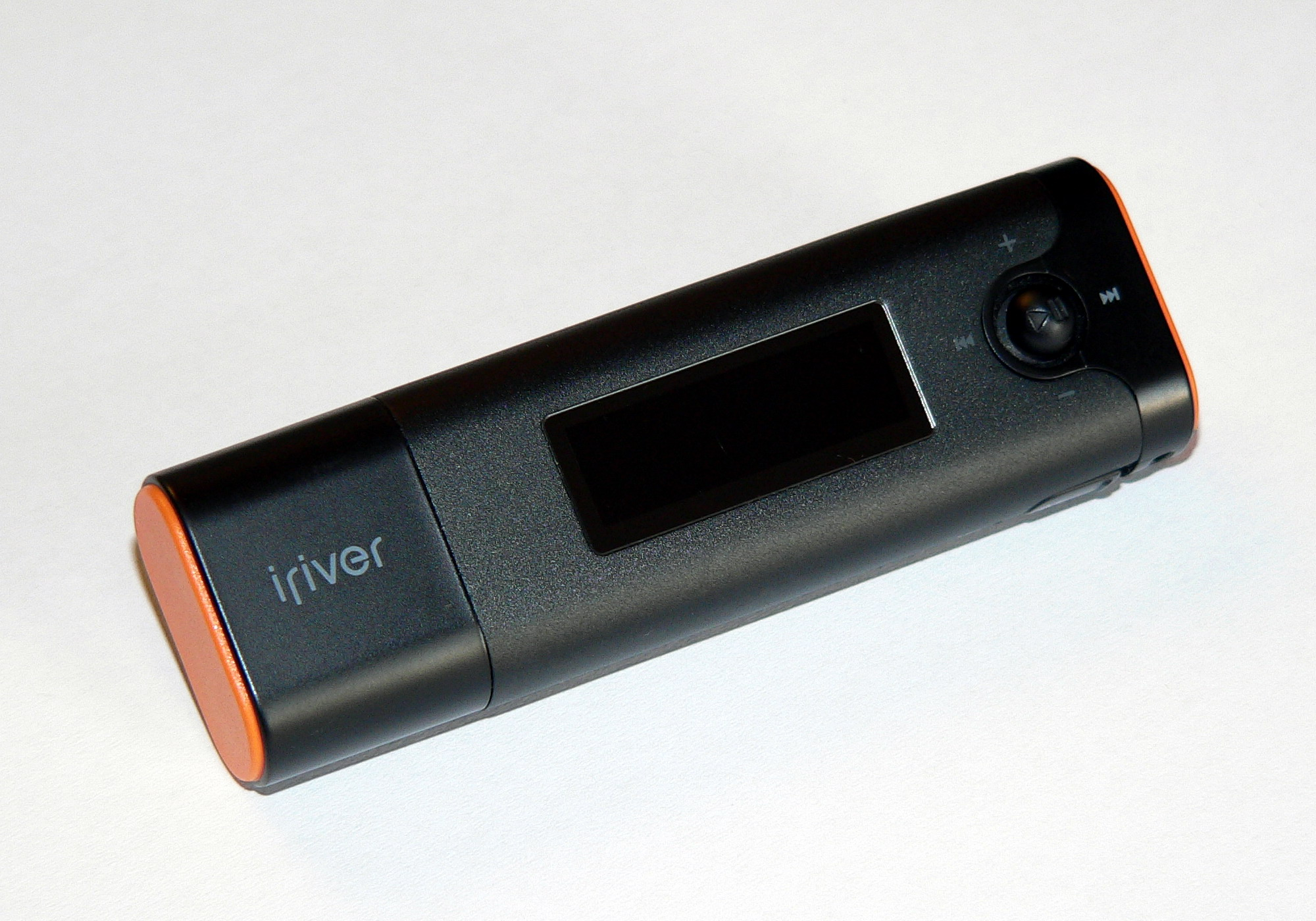
512MB iriver T10 player from 2005 & 2GB T5 player from 2008
- T series - de facto successor of iFP series
  - T5: 4 GB.
  - T6 (Neon): 4 GB. Thin low-end MP3 player. It has a colour 1.8-inch 128×160 screen and light-up touch controls.
  - T7 (Volcano / Stix): (4 GB) 25 mm active matrix 64×128 px OLED display; FM radio with recording facility and voice recording; SRS WOW HD; integrated lithium polymer battery and integrated USB connector.
  - T8 (Candy Bar): 4 GB. Weighs 26 g. Latest model in the T series. 1″ organic light-emitting diode (OLED) 128 x 64 screen.
  - T9: 4 GB
  - T10 (Music Clip): (256 MB, 512 MB, 1 GB, 2 GB) Semi-prism shaped, MTP or UMS.
  - T20 (Metro Look): (256 MB, 512 MB, 1 GB) USB stick design. Voice, line in and FM recording. Built in lithium-ion battery. PlaysForSure and UMS.
  - T30 (Craft III): (256 MB, 512 MB, 1 GB) prism-shaped; line in, PlaysForSure and UMS support.
  - T50: (1 GB) using an AA battery.
  - T60: (1 GB, 2 GB, 4 GB) using an AAA battery. Smaller than T50.
- H series
  - H10 Jr.: (512 MB, 1 GB) A smaller version of the hard drive based H10. USB 2.0 connectivity. FM tuner. Voice and FM recording. Built-in lithium-ion battery. PlaysForSure and UMS.
- E series
  - E100 : (2 GB, 4 GB, 8 GB) A portable media player with video, music, photo and a built-in FM tuner and stereo speakers. Introduced at CES 2008.
  - E50 (Metal): (2 GB, 4 GB, 8 GB) A Minor version of E100. Built with Aluminum.
  - E150: (2 GB, 4 GB, 8 GB) Upgraded version of the E100.
  - E200: (4 GB, 8 GB, 16 GB) Major upgraded version of the E100. Built with full Aluminum.
  - E300: (4 GB, 8 GB)
  - E30 (Matte): (2 GB, 4 GB, 8 GB)
  - E40: (4 GB, 8 GB)
- U series (Clix)
  - U10: (1 GB, 2 GB), 2.2-inch screen, uses D-Click control system, Flash Lite support. Rectangular with rounded edges, 2.2-inch LCD, 70grams, microphone and FM radio recording, cradle available for extra functionality.
  - Clix: (1 GB, 2 GB, 4 GB) iriver's flagship product when released in 2006. Started off as a rebranded U10 player and underwent a completed redesign in 2007 with the 2nd generation player.
  - Clix 2nd generation (U20): (2 GB, 4 GB, 8 GB) Stretched rectangle with rounded edges. Customizable with themes, FM and voice recording, UMS(MSC) – MTP compatible (interchangeable), cradle available for extra functionality. Hi-res AMOLED screen. Player is about the size of a credit card.
  - Clix+: (4 GB, 8 GB) A somewhat flatter Clix model featuring a DMB tuner. Like the previous generations, the Clix+ has a 2.2" AMOLED screen.

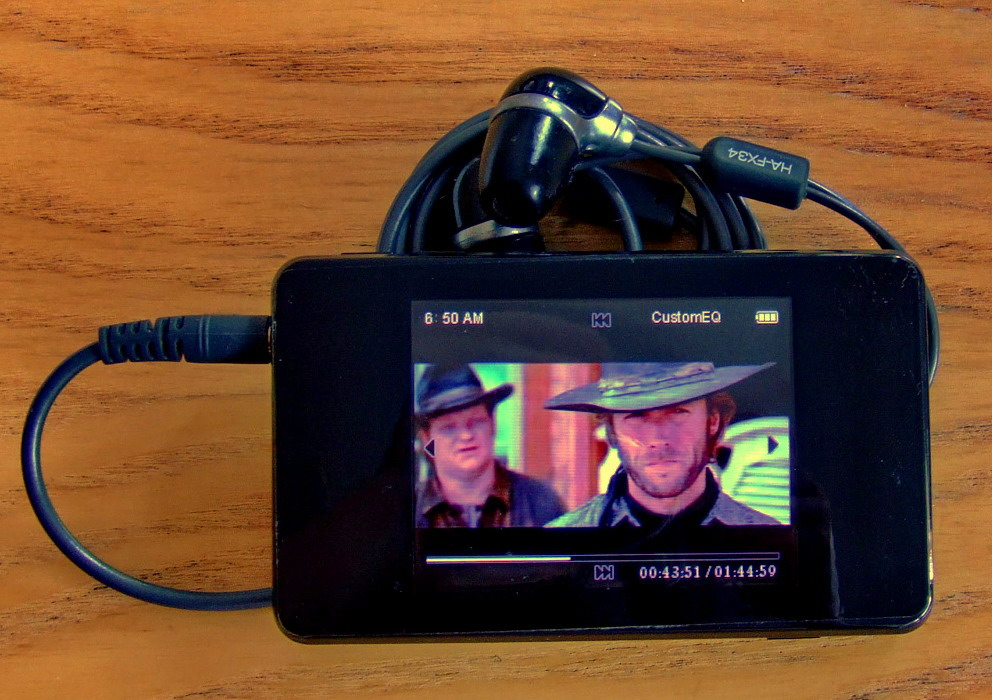
iriver Clix 2 portable media player from 2007

  - LPlayer: (4 GB, 8 GB) A smaller Clix.
  - SPINN (U30): 4 GB, 8 GB, and 16 GB versions with a 3.3-inch AMOLED touchscreen and unique toggle-wheel based tactile controls. Active Matrix OLED Display, FM and voice recording, T-DMB. Successor of Clix 2.
  - U100: Portable media player with Wi-Fi feature. Came out in January, 2011.
- S series - ultra small type
  - S7: (1 GB) Small, screenless version of S10.
  - S10: (2 GB flash) Very small player, only 17.5 g. Has OLED screen. Uses D-Click control system of the U10/Clix. Built in lithium-polymer battery. UMS. USB 2.0 connectivity. Announced September 2006.
  - S100 (Panorama): (4 GB, 8 GB) Weighs 77 g. Has a 2.83" 240 x 320 screen with a T-DMB tuner, FM radio, voice recorder a microSD card slot.
  - Mplayer: (1 GB) A Mickey Mouse head-shaped digital audio player created in collaboration with Disney released in 2007.
  - Mplayer 2: (1 GB) Upgraded version of Mplayer.
  - Mplayer Swarovski (1 GB)
  - Mplayer+: (2 GB)
  - Mplayer Eyes: (2 GB) Variant of Mplayer, 2008.
- Pocket Puppy
- X20: Portable video player with a removable battery. Expandable with microSD cards.
- Astell&Kern - line of premium high-resolution players.

==== CD players ====
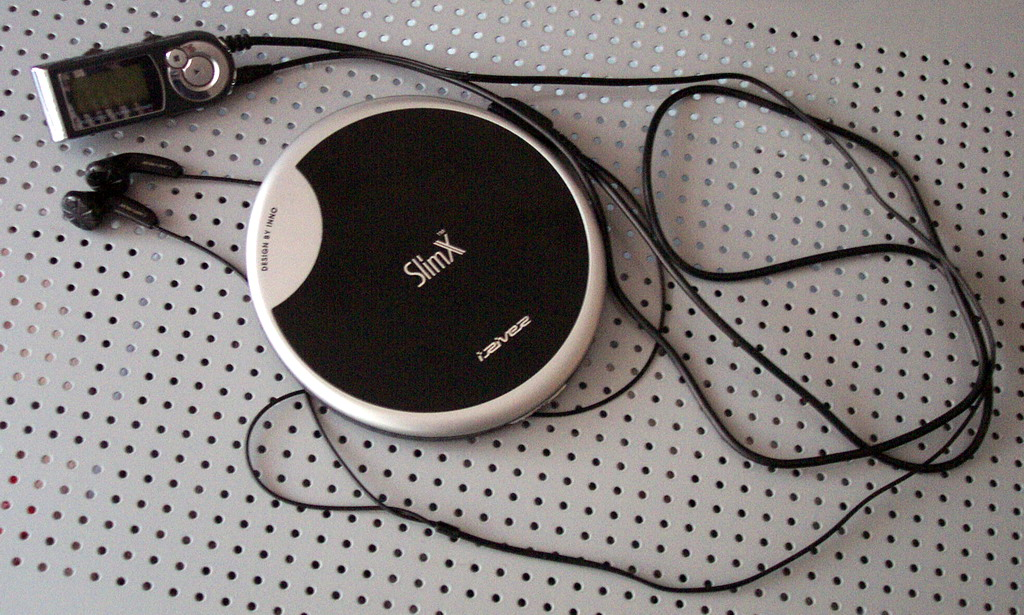
iRiver SlimX iMP-550 player from 2004

These players would play MP3 format CD-R and CD-RW burned discs. The first player was the iMP-100 in 2000. The iMP-250 was released in 2001. OEM orders were received from the American Rio, and led to the iMP-100 and iMP-250 also being released as the RioVolt SP90/100 and SP250. The first SlimX models, iMP-350 and iMP-400, were released in 2002 and became very popular.

- iMP-50
- iMP-100
- iMP-150
- iMP-250
- iMP-350 SlimX
- iMP-400 SlimX
- iMP-450 SlimX
- iMP-550 SlimX
- iMP-900 SlimX
- iMP-700T
- iMP-1000
- iMP-1100

==== DataPlay players ====
In 2002, iRiver introduced the iDP-100 using the short-lived optical format DataPlay; it holds 500 MB data.

==== Portable media players ====
- PMP-120 and PMP-140: (20 GB, 40 GB) ("Portable Media Player") produced 2004 to 2005.
- PMC series: (20 GB, 40 GB) ("Portable Media Center") running Microsoft Windows Mobile-based Portable Media Center, introduced in 2005.
- P7: 4 GB, 8 GB, and 16 GB versions with 4.3-inch, 480 × 272 resolution LCD touchscreen
- P8
- P10: (33 GB) Portable media player with dictionary apps introduced at CES 2008. 1.3" hard disk, 4-inch touchscreen.
- P20
- P35
- P100 IPS
- K1 (Smart HD) : (8 GB, 16 GB) Portable Media Player based on Windows CE Operation Software. Wi-Fi, T-DMB tuner, FM radio, dictionary contents available. 3.5" 320 x 480 TFT-LCD touchscreen.
- W7: widescreen with a touch 3-inch interface available in 4 GB and 8 GB versions. Winner of the MP3 and Portable Video category of "Best of CES Award" by CNET in 2008.
- W10: a media player featuring a 3-inch touchscreen and internet phone function with KT.
- NV series: These have built in satellite navigation
  - NV mini (M3)
  - NV Classic (M7)
  - NV (M10): Similar to NV Life, except it has a turnable wheel to navigate in addition to the touch screen.
  - NV Life (M20): (2 GB and 4 GB): An MP3 player based on Windows CE 5. It has a GPS and DMB feature. It has a touch interface with some keys for volume and power.

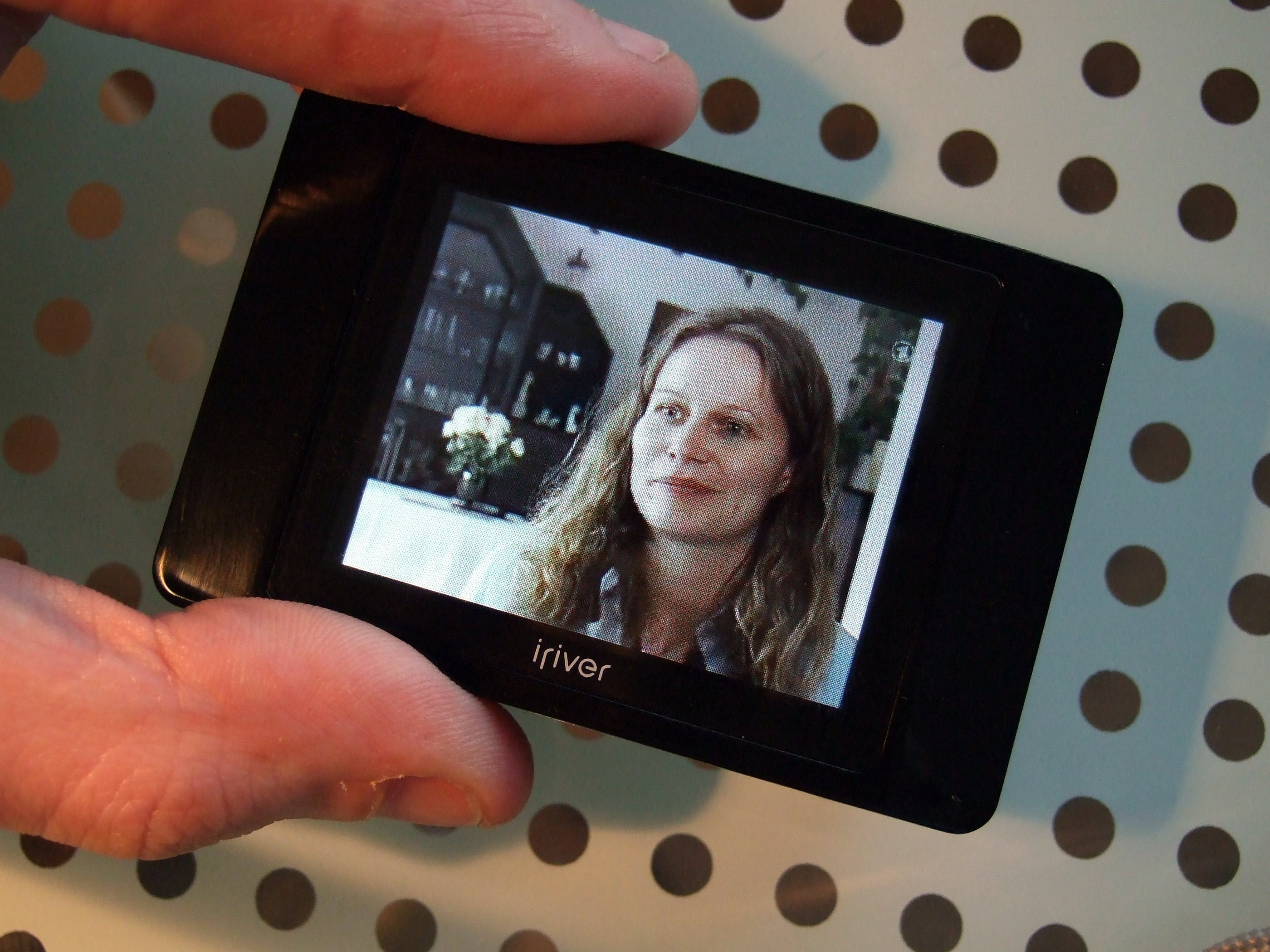
iriver B20 receiving live television via DMB

- B series: These have DMB tuners for watching live TV.
  - B10 "Pocket TV", released 2006. Styled like iriver Clix.
  - B20, also featuring DAB digital radio. Styled like iriver Clix.
  - B30

=== UMPCs, Tablets, Smartphones ===
- iriver Wing was introduced at Consumer Electronics Show January 2008. It was a clamshell ultra-mobile computer with a 4-inch touchscreen display and flat QWERTY keyboard.
- iriver Tab: 7-inch tablet computer running Android, released in 2011.
- iriver WOWtab
- iriver Vanilla: Android 2.2 smartphone
- iriver Ulala: Android 2.3.5 Gingerbread smartphone.

iriver showed off the W10 ultra mobile PC or tablet PC in a Hong Kong Electronics Fair in 2006, but it was not released.

At CES 2006, iriver also showed a new PMP and handheld gaming console called the G10. It was later renamed the Wing but was only expected to have a domestic release. However following delays it was never released.

=== Ebook readers ===
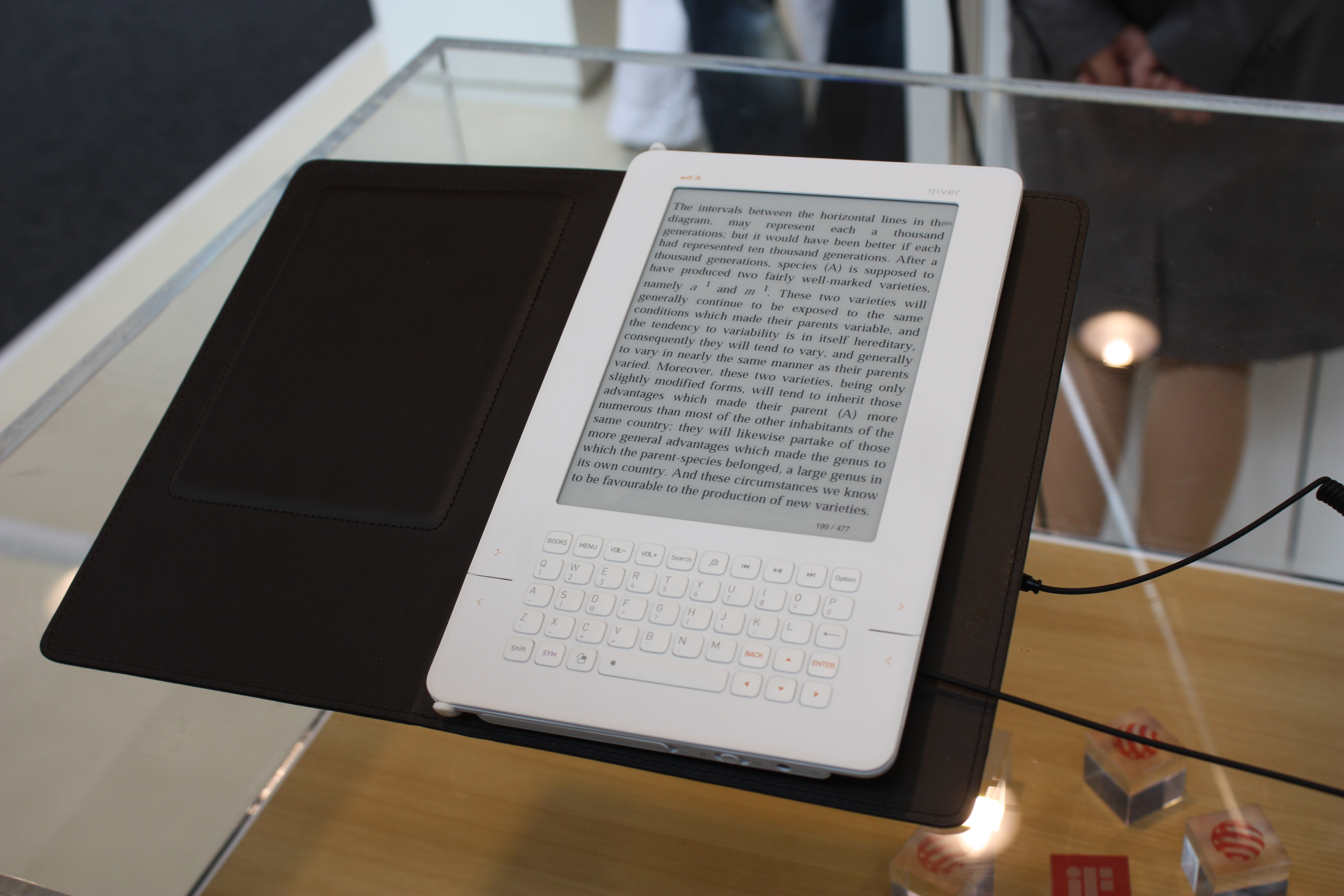
iriver Story e-book reader on display at IFA Berlin 2010

- iriver Story: Electronic ink e-reader, with SD card expansion released in 2010.
- iriver Cover Story: has an extra cover
- iriver Story HD 2011 model added Wi-Fi and an improved screen.

=== Electronic dictionaries (Dicple) ===
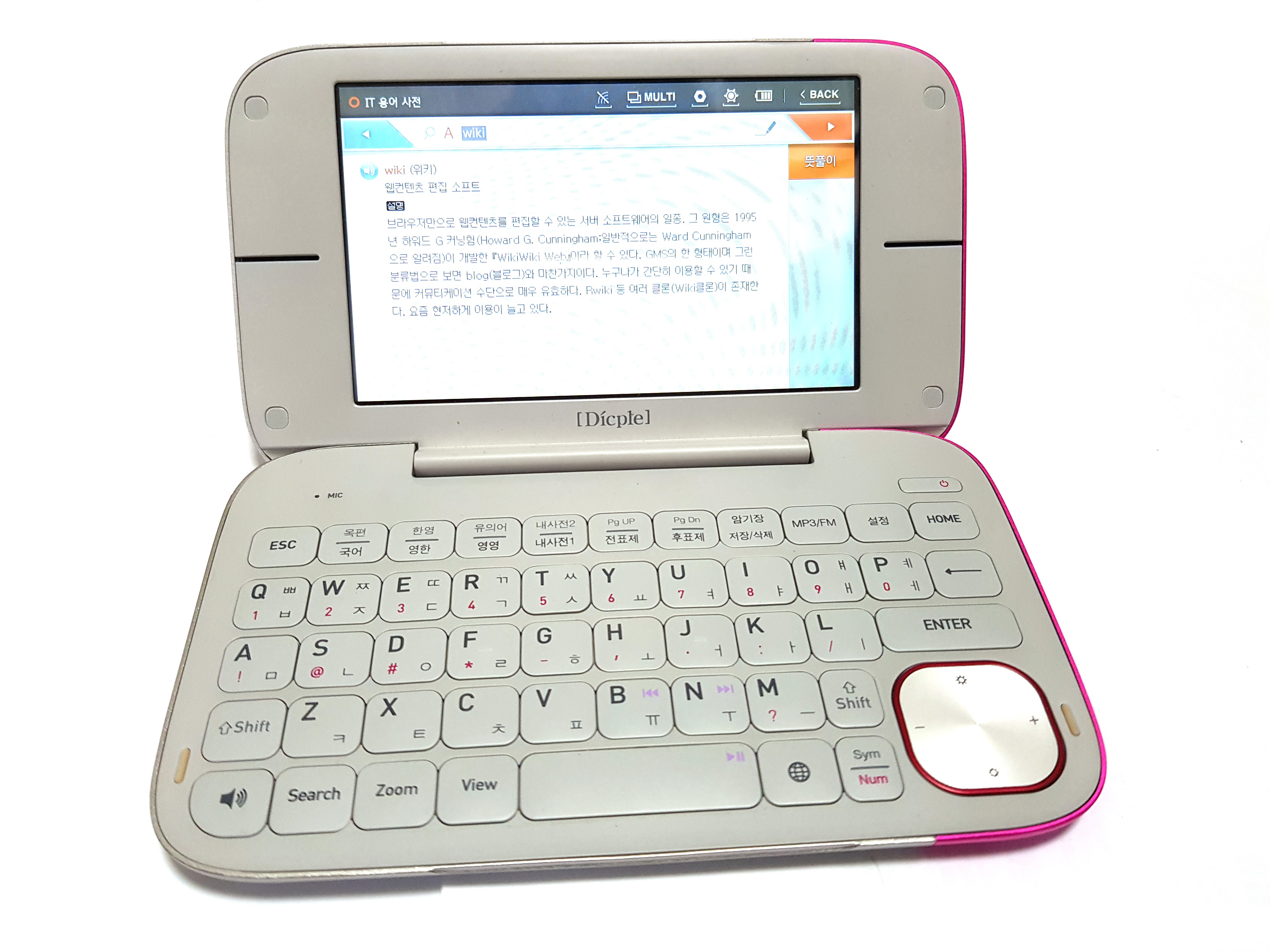
iriver Dicple D2000

Only released in South Korea.

- D-10 (Dicple, derived from “dictionary & MP3 player”) – an electronic dictionary featuring music playback. Released after December 2004.
- D-11
- D-20 (Dicple α) – an electronic dictionary featuring an improved design and a 4.3-inch, 260,000-color TFT display supporting images and additional features beyond a typical electronic dictionary. It is designed to mimic the look of a laptop (with dimensions 176 × 81.9 × 26.7 mm) and is comes in glossy red or black. The device has a 22-hour battery life for browsing the dictionary, and 30 hours for audio. Released after January 2006.
- D-25 (Dicple 51) – An electronic dictionary featuring a 4.3-inch, 260,000-color TFT display and 1.3 GB of flash memory. Also known as “Dicple 51” due to its number of contents. Released after August 2006.
- D-26
- D-27
- D-30
- D-28 – A minor version of the D-30 with the PDF viewer and touchscreen removed.
- D-5
- D-33
- D-50N
- D-100
- D-150
- D-200
- D-1000
- D-2000
- D-3000
- D-3300

== See also ==
- Digital audio player
- Rockbox (alternative, open source firmware for the iriver H10, H100 and H300 series)
