= IRiver E100 =

Portable media player

iRiver E100
- Manufacturer: iRiver
- Type: Digital audio player Portable media player
- Lifespan: February 28, 2008 (Europe)
- Media: 2 / 4 / 8 GB flash memory, microSD up to 16GB
- Operating system: Custom user interface
- Display: 2.4" backlit TFT screen (320 x 240)
- Input: D*Click (up, down, left, right buttons), power/hold/volume buttons
- Connectivity: USB 2.0 - MSC / MTP

The iRiver E100 is a portable media player developed by iRiver. It features a 2.4" TFT LCD 320x240 colour screen, built-in 1 watt speakers, a line in port and a microSD card expansion slot up to 8GB. The user interface is navigated by using the iRiver "D*Click" scheme. However, the controls are isolated to the lower section of the device's front. There are minimal buttons located on the side of the device including a power button and two-in-one volume bar. There is also a "hold" switch located on the other side of the device.

The iRiver E100 is capable of playing music files in various formats including FLAC, Ogg, APE, DRM and non-DRM WMA files, MP3 with image and 2-lines karaoke. Video files in MPEG, AVI (MPEG-4 codec support), MP4, WMV and FLV (can play YouTube FLV directly, without conversion). Photos in JPEG (non-progressive), BMP, GIF, PNG formats. Texts in TXT format (supports a lot of foreign languages including all European languages, Russian, Chinese, Japanese, Hebrew, Indian, Korean etc.). Has an in-built podcast-ready Voice Audio Recorder with internal microphone (it is also possible to attach external professional stereo microphones) and FM Radio (with Radio Recorder) which is customisable in E100 devices running E100 firmware 1.03 or higher through the iriver plus 3 software. All recordings are directly encoded to WMA format.

First released in Europe on leap day, the iriver E100 was priced at €79.99, €99.99 and €129.99 for 2 GB, 4 GB and 8 GB variants respectively and came in five colours; White, Black, Chocolate Brown, Sky Blue and Pink.

== Firmware and software ==
The iRiver E100's firmware is upgradeable using a special Windows application which is bundled with the iriver E100. The device was released in Europe with Firmware version 1.02 preloaded. The firmware updater, which can be downloaded from the iRiver support site, does not run on 64-bit versions of Windows. However the firmware updater on the original software CD does.

Version	Release Data	Upgrade Points
1.03	March 13, 2008	Setting Radio Tuner channel with iriverplus3. It also reportedly fixed many problems with unresponsive controls when scrolling through menus.
1.04	March 24, 2008	Hang problems are fixed when it plays a specific file.
1.05	April 7, 2008	Supporting Playlist function under MTP mode. Supporting Line-in AutoSync. Users can upgrade their firmware through the iriver plus 3 software or through the firmware updater software bundled with the device.
1.06	May 9, 2008	Hang problems are fixed inserting Micro SD Card. Hang problems are fixed playing FLAC files.
1.07	June 11, 2008	Random noise problems are fixed between files while listening. Improved Language Selection
1.15	January 21, 2009	Revise malfunctions of playing video files. Revise malfunctions of icons as pressing Rewinding.
1.16	February 24, 2009	Revise malfunction of broken letters.
1.18	April 20, 2009	Revise system time error.
1.21	May 25, 2009	Revise Album Art error when playing the specific file. (Malfunction of Fade In./persists system time error.)
1.22	September 25, 2009	Fade in malfunction is fixed.(persists system time error.)

=== Software for E100 Karaoke ===
The iRiver Caption Editor allows to edit or to create new lyrics files (.snc) for MP3. It is a program for creating SNC lyrics files (manually synchronized with MP3 songs). Adding SNC to MP3 with iRiver Caption Editor doesn't work for E100. The program can only be used for manual synchronization of the song text with mp3, and creating new SNC files.

The iRiver LDB Manager allows to find files with lyrics automatically from the internet database, and then add karaoke text into MP3. This software also allows to add lyrics from SNC file into MP3 file (previously created with iRiver Caption Editor) that is viewable on E100.
