= Sound Retrieval System =

Audio processing technology

SRS

Sound Retrieval System (SRS) is a patented psychoacoustic 3D audio processing technology originally invented by Arnold Klayman in the early 1980s. The SRS technology applies head-related transfer functions (HRTFs) to create an immersive 3D soundfield using only two speakers, widening the "sweet spot", creating a more spacious sense of ambience, and producing strong localization cues for discrete instruments within an audio mix. SRS is not a Dolby matrix surround decoder but works with normal stereo recordings.

== History ==
"SRS Tru Bass" logo

"SRS Dialog Clarity" logo

"SRS TruSurroundXT" logo

Initially Hughes Aircraft, for whom Klayman was doing acoustic consulting at the time, offered a standalone SRS audio processor, as well as licensing the technology to Sony and Thomson (RCA) for inclusion in their products. In the early 1990s, Hughes sold off its non-aerospace-related holdings, and a group of entrepreneurs formed SRS Labs to acquire the SRS technology.

Many TV sets employ built-in SRS to make their built-in audio systems soundstages "bigger". An article in the November 1994 issue of Consumers Digest magazine tested several SRS-equipped sets from Sony and other manufacturers and concluded that the circuit was essentially a gimmick in these products due to their small, close-set speakers and low-wattage amplifiers. SRS is not a panaceum for audio systems that are marginal to begin with; it works best with full-range, high-fidelity sound reproduction.

The company (publicly traded on NASDAQ under the symbol SRSL after a 1996 IPO) since developed or acquired several additional audio technologies, including SRS Headphone, TruSurround XT, TruBass ("psychoacoustic bass enhancement to enable deeper, natural bass of audio source material to be perceived over small speaker drivers"), FOCUS ("sound-image elevation used in combination with SRS to create a large sound image", originally conceived for in-car listening), SRS Virtual Surround, Circle Surround, SRS Wow (an audio-enhancement suite made up of SRS 3D "wide stereo imaging and nonfatiguing headphone listening mode", Focus and TruBass) and SRS Wow HD, Dialog Clarity, and VIP, most using psychoacoustic principles similar to those employed by the SRS technology. SRS or one of its derivatives is offered in products from a wide range of professional and consumer audio manufacturers as well as in SRS's own small stable of products. The company derives most of its revenue from licensing its technologies, which it does in both silicon and software form.

SRS Wow was implemented in many devices such as music players, and in software such as Microsoft's Windows Media Player for playing sound on a computer.

In 2012 DTS, Inc. acquired the business of SRS Labs, including over 1,000 audio patents and trademarks.

The original SRS patents are US 4866774, US 4748669 and US 4841572, which expired between 2006 and 2008. Patents may apply in other countries.

== See also ==
- SRS Labs
- DSEE
- DTS (sound system)
- QSound
