= IRiver H300 series =

Series of discontinued portable digital audio players

iRiver H300 series
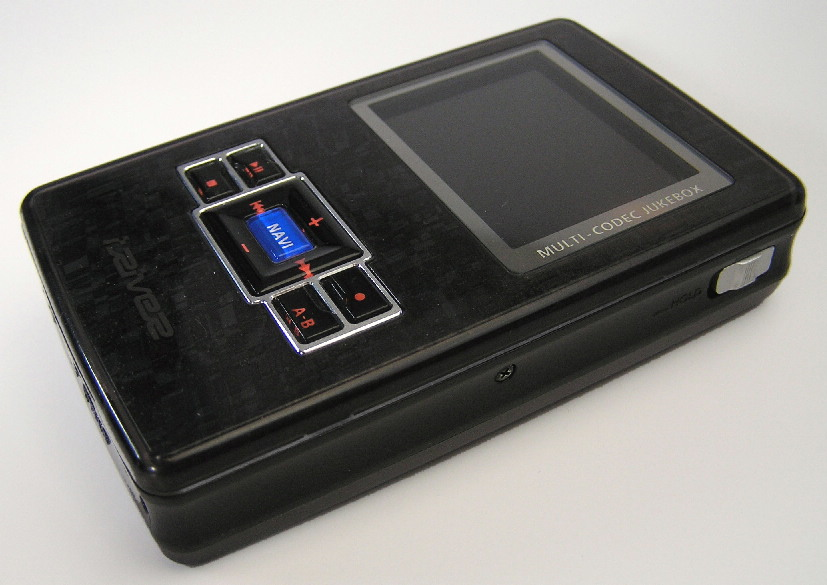
- The iriver H320 model
- Also known as: iRiver H300
- Developer: iRiver
- Manufacturer: iRiver
- Type: Portable audio player
- Lifespan: 2004 – 2005
- Media: Hard drive (either 20 or 40 GB)
- CPU: Motorola Coldfire
- Display: 2" colour display at 220 x 176 pixels
- Input: Phone connector
- Connectivity: USB 2.0
- Power: Lithium polymer battery (1300 mAh)
- Predecessor: iRiver H100 series
- Successor: iriver H10 series

The iRiver H300 series are a series of portable audio players developed by iRiver, made up of the iRiver H320 and H340 models. They were first announced on September 22, 2004 replacing the H100/iHP-100. Each can play music, transfer pictures directly from digital cameras and UMS-compatible devices, such as flash drives (on the international version), and display digital images on a colour screen. In the United States, the H320 initially retailed for $329 and the H340 was $429.

== Features ==
The iRiver H300 devices support the playback of MP3, Ogg, WMA, ASF and WAV encoded audio files, with an advertised 16 hours playback time. Alongside this, it features an FM radio with 20 pre-set memories. It can also record voice and FM radio via internal or external microphone, or line-in, to MP3 format.

It supports the viewing of JPEG and BMP pictures, as well as TXT files.

Since firmware v1.2, the devices can play movies at 10 or 15 frames per second with XviD (AVI) encoding.

== Hardware ==
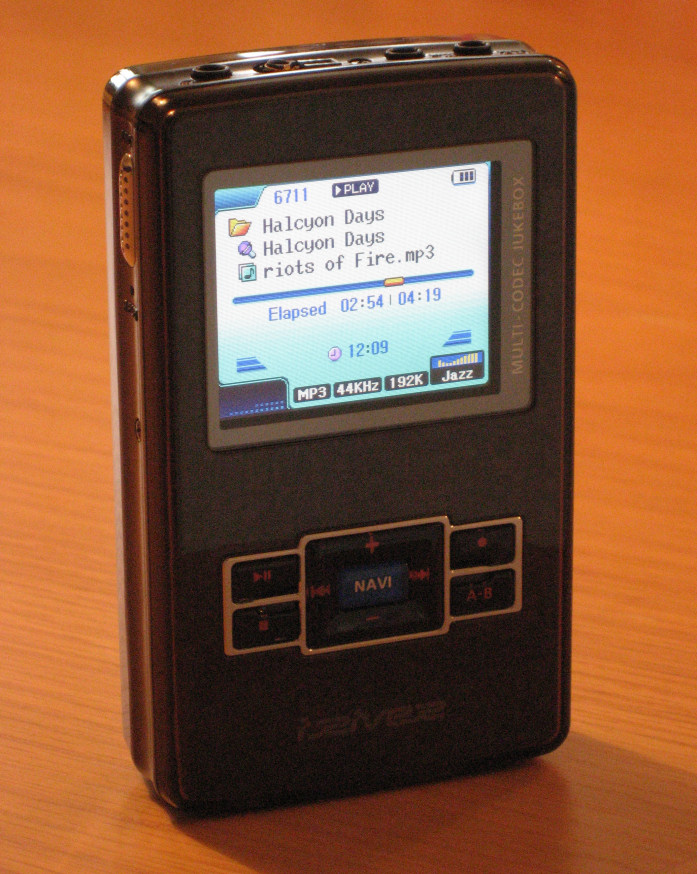
iRiver H340

There are two models:

- iRiver H320
  - Toshiba MK2004GAL 20 GB 1.8" hard disk with a depth of 5 mm
  - Size is approx. 62x103x22 mm (Width x Height x Depth)
  - Weight is approx. 183 g
- iRiver H340
  - Toshiba MK4004GAH 40 GB hard disk 1.8" hard disk with a depth of 8 mm
  - Size is approx. 62x103x25 mm
  - Weight is approx. 203 g

There are two hardware types for each model. These hardware types are commonly referred to by the locations they are sold. The USA models, predominantly sold in North America, have a built in DRM key, which lets them play music with Microsoft DRM. The International models, sold everywhere but North America, do not handle DRM-restricted content and have the HOST port linked to the battery, which allows them to do USB On-The-Go. The International models also support limited xvid (10 frame/s) video playback.

North American models can be modified to support USB OTG by means of a small internal soldering job, an external modified cable, or a USB transfer box. International firmware is also required.

== Firmware ==
There are 4 different firmware editions available for H300's

- European - FM Radio tuner is fixed to European frequencies and the volume is limited as per EU directive. The video icon and mode introduced in v1.29 of the firmware is also not available due to licensing issues in Europe. This firmware is designated by an E appended to the version number. This firmware also ships in Australia and New Zealand.
- Korean - FM Radio frequency is selectable between European, Korean, Japanese or Americas standards. Volume is not limited. This firmware is designated by a K appended to the version number.
- Japanese - Same as Korean but defaults to Japanese tuner region. This firmware is designated by a J appended to the version number.
- Americas - Capable of playing WMA DRM protected music. This firmware has been updated twice since v1.02 (v1.03, v1.04) and does not have video support. It is also not possible to upgrade US firmware to any other firmware (including v1.03 unless it comes on the player) without permanently losing DRM capabilities.

=== Version history ===
There have been different versions of the firmware over time

International

This firmware applies to the European, Korean and Japanese editions of the firmware.

- 1.02: First "standard" firmware made for the players when released
- 1.07: Shipped with new players only
- 1.08: Shipped with new players only
- 1.20: Added video playback support
- 1.25: Video improved (fast-forward and rewind added) and also introduced a bug which reduced battery life considerably
- 1.27: Battery bug fixed and still better video
- 1.28: Added clock and WAV playback. Added use of subfolders in "text" mode and playback speed. Use of remote control no longer triggers player backlight. First version that correctly preserves dates on files copied via USB-OTG
- 1.29: Released November 2005 – Added video icon & mode, JPEG thumbnails, Hebrew/Greek tags, 24-hour clock, resume playlist playback and true shuffle bug fixes, including bug fixes regarding the remote control's backlight. Korean firmware defaults to Korean language for the control panel.
- 1.30: Released December 2005 – This release is for the European firmware only. Due to licensing issues in Europe, it removed the video icon & mode added in release 1.29.
- 1.31: Released November 20, 2006 – Added quicklist (playlist) and a game (Minesweeper). No word on any other additions or bugfixes. (UMS only, not for US MTP. players.)

American

This firmware only applies to the America's edition of the firmware.

- 1.02: Shipped with new players only
- 1.03: Shipped with new players only
- 1.04: Release November 2005 - Added support for .WAV playback, adjustable playback speed, JPEG thumbnails, Hebrew/Greek tags, resume playlist playback, TEXT support for subfolders, true shuffle and bug fixes. This is the first version that can upgrade the America's firmware

=== Custom ===
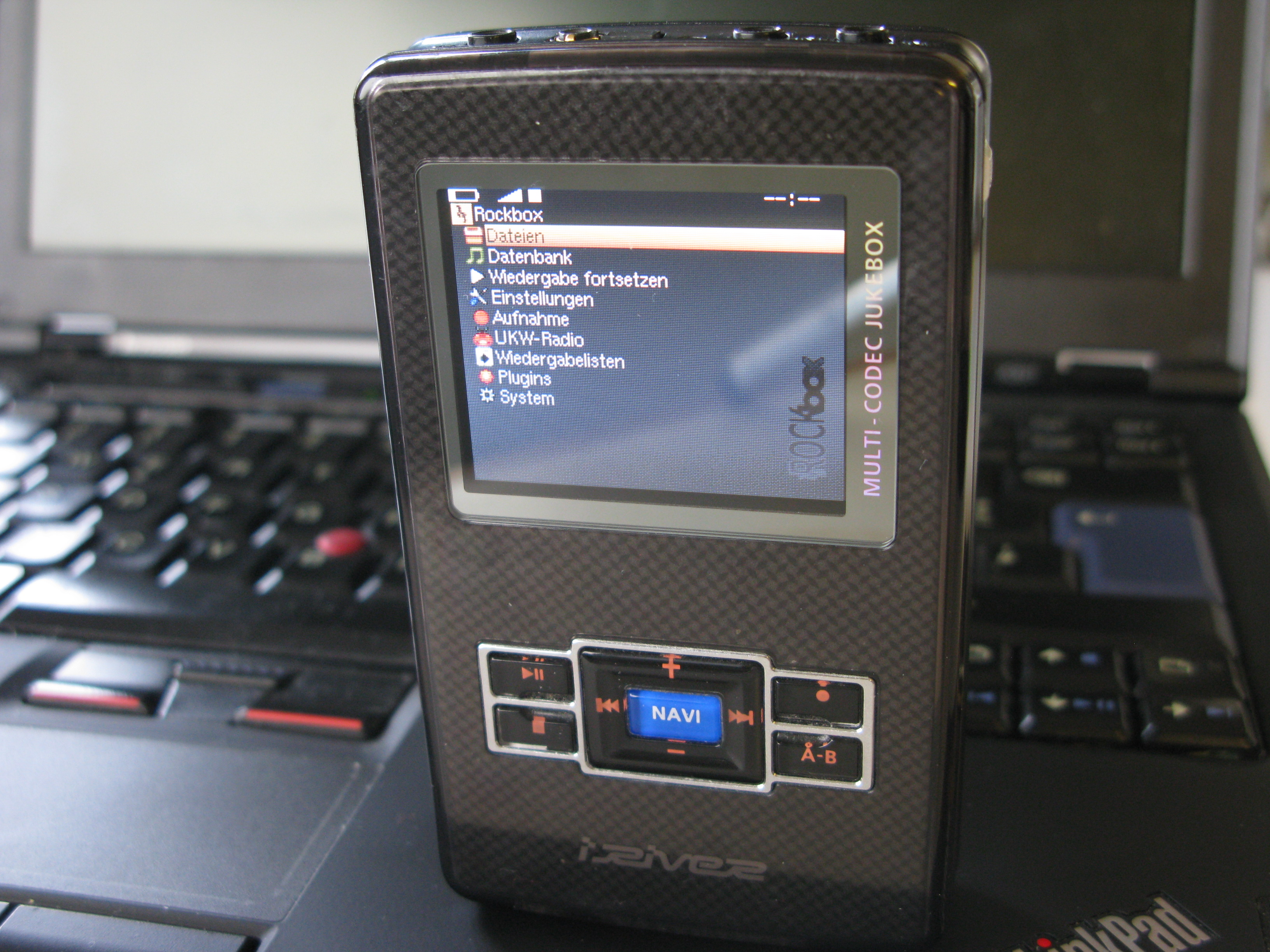
iRiver H320 running Rockbox

The H300 series can run Rockbox, an alternative, open source firmware.
