= Gruvi =

Gruvi was a short-lived memory card format compatible with microSD developed by Sandisk in 2006. It used the company's TrustedFlash card technology, which functioned like the conventional SD card but it could be extended to on-demand content. The cards were intended for the distribution of music and videos and had a variety of special Digital rights management features including the ability to pre-load content that could be 'unlocked' at a later date.

The Gruvi packaging of A Bigger Bang

The announced objective was the replacement of CDs, which was highlighted by the involvement of music publisher EMI when the product was launched. The cards featured a picture of the artist whose music was pre-loaded. They were compatible with mobile phones, tablets, and laptop computers.

Only a handful of Gruvi cards were ever released, one of them was the album A Bigger Bang by the Rolling Stones.

== slotMusic ==
SanDisk repeated their attempt at a flash-media-based music distribution format in 2008, with the introduction of slotMusic, this time without DRM. The cards were sold with music published by major record labels EMI, Sony BMG, Warner, and Universal.
