= Zune software =

Media management software by Microsoft

- Local music library on Zune, running in Windows 10
- Developer: Microsoft
- Release: November 14, 2006
- Final release: 4.08.2345 / August 22, 2011
- Operating system: Windows XP SP3; Windows Vista SP2; Windows 7 Windows 8/8.1
- Predecessor: Windows Mobile Device Center
- Successor: Groove Music; Microsoft Movies & TV
- Type: Utility software
- License: Proprietary software
- Website: Zune software for your PC

Zune is a discontinued software program that was developed by Microsoft for Windows that functions as a full media player, library, media streaming server, mobile device management, and interface for the discontinued Zune Marketplace. The software is used to sync with all devices with Zune functionality including the Zune 4, 8, 16, 30, 80, 120, Zune HD, Windows Phone 7, and Microsoft Kin. Zune devices work exclusively with the Zune software, which applies many design principles of Microsoft's Metro design language.

Following the discontinuation of Zune hardware in 2011, the software program was put into maintenance mode. In October 2012 its replacements products were launched: the new phone companion app is used for syncing with devices running Windows Phone 8 (including 8.1) and Windows 10 Mobile, while Xbox Music (later known as Groove Music) and Microsoft Movies & TV were launched to fill Zune's role as a media player and streamer. Zune online services were completely shut down on November 15, 2015.

== Content ==
As a media player, the Zune software supports the following formats:

multimedia	supported formats
Audio	MP3, AAC (Low complexity), .mp4, .m4b, .mov, WMA (standard, pro, and lossless)
Video	MPEG4 (in .mp4, .m4v and .mov containers), H.264 (in .mp4, .m4v and .mov containers), WMV, ASF, AVI (in .avi container)
Images	JPEG

The Zune software organizes the media in its library and allows users to add to the library by ripping from CDs, syncing with a Zune device, and downloading from the Zune Marketplace. The Zune software also allows one to organize song metadata. It can automatically download album art and metadata tag data for content in the library.

On the PC, the Zune software streams files to other PCs, the Xbox 360, and other compatible devices. The Zune software also connects with the Zune social and keeps track of files swapped with other users.

The Zune software runs only on 32-bit Windows XP or 32-bit/64-bit Windows Vista/Windows 7. Windows XP Professional x64 Edition is not supported. The Zune software is also compatible with Windows 8 and Windows 10 so Zune device users would have continued legacy support on the new operating system, despite the Zune brand's phasing out before the 2012 release of the OS.

=== History ===
The first version of the Zune Software, which is based on Windows Media Player 11.

The 1.0 versions of the Zune software were a modified version of Windows Media Player 11 while versions since 2.0 are built independently with additional DirectShow decoders for AAC, MPEG-4 and H.264. The current version of the software is 4.08.2345, released on August 22, 2011. Several versions of the software have been released. As of October 16, 2012 Zune became Xbox Music.

== Zune Marketplace ==
Zune Marketplace was an online store that offered music, podcasts, TV shows, movies, music videos, and mobile applications. Content could be viewed or purchased on Windows PCs with the Zune software installed, Zune devices, the Xbox 360, Windows Phone phones, or the Microsoft Kin phones. Zune Music Marketplace has since been superseded by Xbox Music.

=== Music ===
Initially offering 2 million songs, the Zune Marketplace had grown to offer 14 million songs, all of which were available in MP3 format at up to 320 kbit/s and were DRM-free. Music on Zune Marketplace was offered by the big four music groups (EMI, Warner Music Group, Sony BMG and Universal Music Group), as well as smaller music labels.

The home page of the Zune Marketplace shows featured music as selected by Microsoft, and the most popular music. Users can search, or filter by genres including rock, pop, dance, urban, and others.

Prior to Zune Marketplace's music becoming DRM-free, songs were protected by Windows Media DRM, however, the Zune Software only allowed WMDRM content from the Zune Marketplace to be transferred to Zune devices. Zune Marketplace DRM content could be played by other WMDRM compatible applications and devices.

=== Videos ===
Zune Marketplace offers television shows from the following companies: A&E, Anime, Bravo, Cartoon Network, CBS, Discovery Communications, E!, Fox, 20th Century Fox Television, G4, GamerTV, History Channel, Marvel, MLB, NBC, Universal Media Studios, Paley Center, PBS, Spike, Starz, SyFy, TNA, USA Network, and Viacom.

Movies from Paramount, Universal, Warner Bros. Pictures, 20th Century Fox and other studios are offered for purchase or time-limited rental. Some movies are available in HD. Selected content purchased via Zune Marketplace on the Xbox 360 additionally offers 5.1 surround sound.

Music videos were also offered for purchase. Zune Video Marketplace has been superseded by Xbox Video.

=== Applications ===
Zune Marketplace included an applications section where apps and games could be downloaded for the Zune HD. The store initially launched with nine apps, all of which were developed by Microsoft and released for free. The selection of apps expanded to sixty-two games and applications over two years. Apps that were available included several games, Facebook, Twitter, and Windows Live Messenger. Applications are also available from various independent developers made using XNA Game Studio or OpenZDK, which use C# and C++ respectively. On August 31, 2012, the apps sections of the Zune Marketplace and users' media collections were disabled within the software.

The Zune software also allowed users to browse, purchase, and install Windows Phone apps from Windows Phone Marketplace.

=== International availability ===
Zune Marketplace was originally only available in the United States. In October 2010, certain Zune Marketplace content became available in additional countries in North America, Europe, Asia, and Australasia. The following table shows content availability by country:

Content	Countries
Music	United States, United Kingdom, France, Italy, Spain, Germany, Canada, Australia
Zune Music Pass	United States, United Kingdom, France, Italy, Spain, Canada, Australia
Podcasts	United States
TV	United States, Canada
Movie Rental	United States, United Kingdom, Canada, Australia, Austria, Belgium, Denmark, Finland, France, Germany, Ireland, Italy, Japan, Mexico, Netherlands, New Zealand, Norway, Spain, Sweden, Switzerland
Movie Purchase	United States, United Kingdom, Canada, Australia, Austria, Belgium, Denmark, Finland, France, Germany, Ireland, Italy, Japan, Mexico, Netherlands, New Zealand, Norway, Spain, Sweden, Switzerland
Applications	United States, United Kingdom, France, Italy, Spain, Germany, Japan, South Korea, Canada, Hong Kong, Australia, New Zealand, Austria, Belgium, Brazil, Chile, Colombia, Czech Republic, Denmark, Finland, Greece, Hungary, Ireland, Mexico, Netherlands, Norway, Poland, Portugal, Romania, Russia, Singapore, South Africa, Sweden, Switzerland, Taiwan

It has been discovered that there are a number of workarounds for accessing the Zune Pass and other Zune Marketplace capabilities outside of the countries where it has been launched.

=== Platforms ===
The Zune software for Windows PCs offers the entire selection of music, podcasts, videos, and applications. The Xbox 360 offers movie and music video downloads, as well as Zune Pass streaming. Zune devices, Windows Phone devices and the Microsoft Kin phones permit the download and streaming of music; Windows Phone devices additionally allow the download of applications.

=== Pricing ===
Purchases are made in the Microsoft Points currency, which can also be used to purchase content from Xbox Live and Games for Windows Live marketplaces. The exchange rate is one United States dollar to 80 Microsoft points. Most music tracks are priced at 79 points or 99 points. This works out to US$0.9875 or US$1.24 per song.

=== Zune Music Pass ===
Zune Music Pass is a music subscription service, which allows subscribers to download an unlimited number of songs for as long as their subscription is active. The songs can be played on up to 3 Windows PCs and on up to 3 other Zune-compatible devices, but cannot be burned to an audio CD. Songs downloaded using Zune Pass are provided in WMA format at 192 kbit/s and are restricted by DRM. Zune Music Pass subscribers in the United States and other select countries were permitted to keep 10 songs per month even after their subscription ended, however the incentive was ultimately discontinued. On October 3, 2011, the Zune Music Pass price was lowered to $9.99/month, and the 10 song credit was removed. On October 15, 2012, Microsoft re-branded Zune as Xbox Music on the Xbox 360 with the promise of a complete rollout on October 26.

== See also ==
- Comparison of online music stores
- Zune
- Zune Social
- Xbox Music
- Xbox Video
- Windows Phone
- Xbox 360
- iPhone (1st generation)
- iPod Touch
