= Zune 4, 8, 16 =

Portable media player models

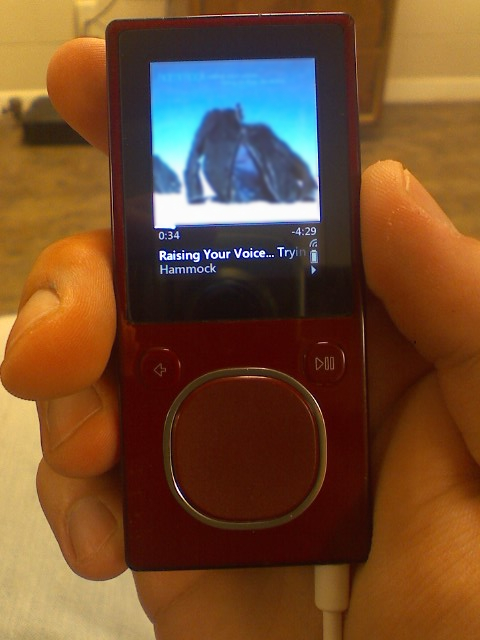
- Manufacturer: Microsoft
- Type: Portable media player
- Released: (United States) November 13, 2007; (Canada) June 13, 2008
- Operating system: Microsoft Windows
- Storage: 4 / 8 / 16 GB flash memory
- Display: 320 x 240 resolution, 1.8 in. diagonal, scratch resistant glass
- Input: Zune Pad
- Touchpad: Squircle-shaped Zune Pad
- Connectivity: Wi-Fi, USB, Microsoft PixelSense (Wireless, formerly Surface)
- Power: 3.7 V 720 mAh; Internal rechargeable non-removable lithium-ion polymer battery
- Current firmware: 3.30
- Online services: Zune Marketplace
- Dimensions: 3.6 x 1.6 x 0.33 in. (91.5 x 41.4 x 8.5 mm)
- Weight: 1.7 oz.
- Predecessor: Zune 30
- Successor: Zune HD
- Related: Zune 80, 120

The Zune 4, Zune 8, and Zune 16 are second-generation models of the Zune lineup, they were first announced on October 2, 2007 and released on November 13, 2007 in the United States and June 13, 2008 in Canada. They are flash memory-based players meant to compete with the iPod Nano and the Sansa Fuze, both smaller and cheaper than the three hard drive-based Zune devices, the Zune 30, Zune 80, and Zune 120. They feature music, video, and podcast support, and come with Wi-Fi and FM Radio.

== Overview ==
The D-pad of the original Zune has been replaced by the Zune pad, which allows for touch-sensitive controls in addition to 5-way clicking. Wi-Fi is used for wireless synchronization and for sharing photos, podcasts, and music with other Zunes, although shared songs may only be played three times by the receiving Zune. The FM Radio includes RBDS support for displaying song and station metadata, but does not support HD-Radio. The flash Zune models also feature scratch resistant glass screens, similar to the screens used on the v2 Zunes.

Zune 4/8/16 comparison
	Zune 4	Zune 8	Zune 16
Flash storage	4 GB	8 GB	16 GB
Processor	399 MHz ARM Core Freescale i.MX31L		
RAM	64MB (16MB available for games)		
Directional pad	Uses a Zune Pad, a "squircle" shaped control featuring touch sensitive controls along with standard direction pad controls		
Suggested retail price	79.99 US$	99.99 US$	159.99 US$
Screen	320x240, 1.8 inches, scratch-resistant glass		
Dimensions	41.4 x 91.5 x 8.5 mm (1.6 x 3.6 x 0.33-inches)		
Weight	1.7 oz (47 g)		
Battery life	28 hours (estimated, audio-only, no Wi-Fi)		

== Reception ==
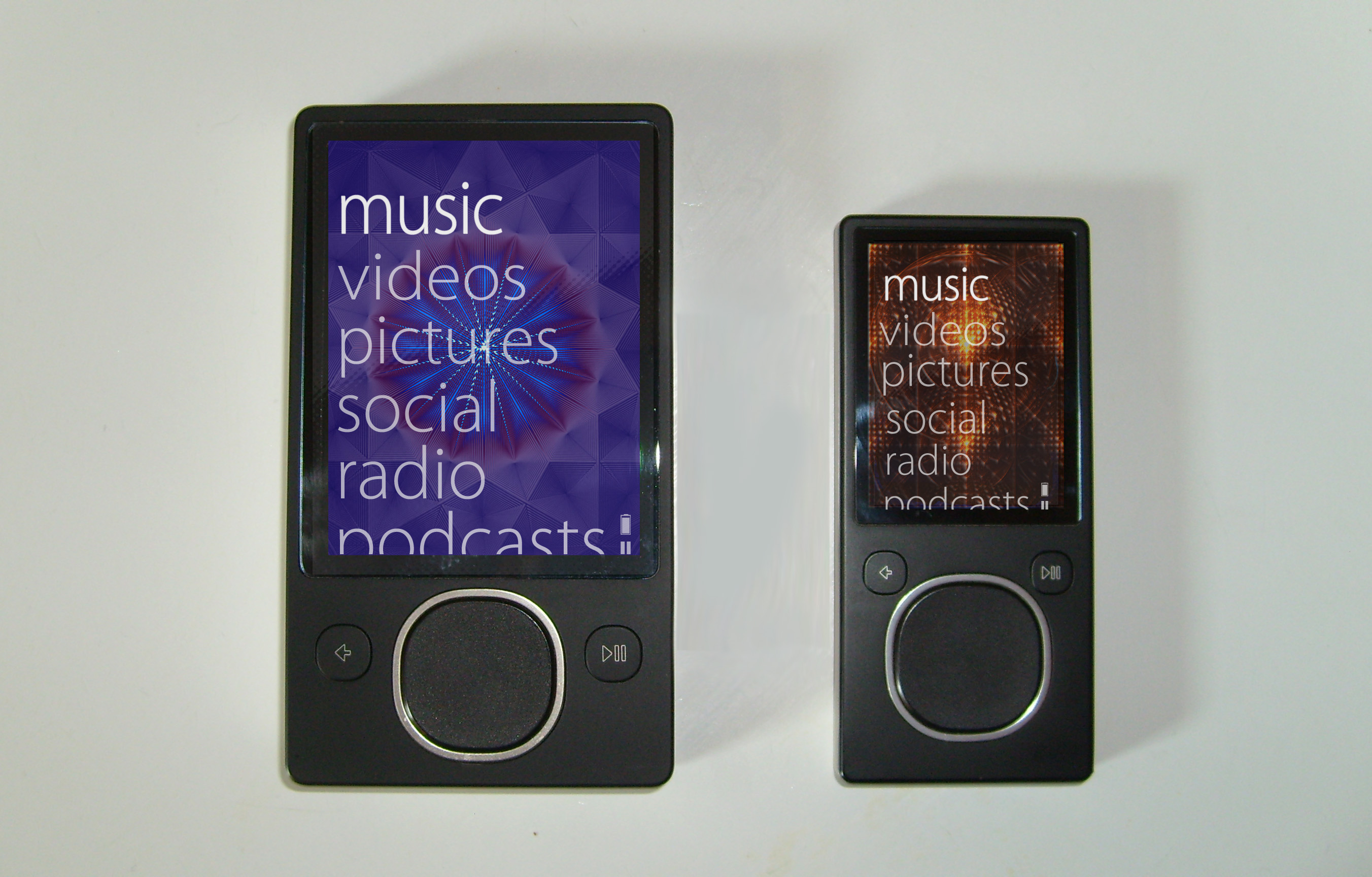
Zune 80/120 and Zune 4/8/16 menu system

The Zune 4, 8, and 16 have gotten generally positive reception. Positives and negatives mimic those of the Zune 80 and 120, as the 4, 8, and 16 are very similar devices in a smaller package: the Wi-Fi, user interface, and excellent sound quality are praised. Some reviews have mentioned the lack of TV shows in the Zune Marketplace, it has since been updated with the ability to purchase and rent TV shows and movies.

== Specifications ==
The specifications as listed by the official web site of the Zune:

- 1.8-inch color display with 320×240 resolution
- 4, 8, and 16 GB flash memory options
- CPU: 399 MHz ARM Core Freescale i.MX31L
- RAM: 64 MB
- 802.11b/g Wi-Fi compatible with open, WEP, WPA, and WPA2 authentication modes and WEP 64-bit and 128-bit, TKIP, and AES encryption modes
- Built in Li-Ion rechargeable with up to 24 hours of audio playback (wireless off) and video, up to 4 hours
- Size: 41.4 mm x 91.5 mm x 8.5 mm
- Weight: 1.7 ounces (47 grams)
- FM radio tuner
- Audio support:
  - CBR and VBR audio, up to 48 kHz sample rate:
    - WMA Standard Up to 320 kbit/s
    - WMA Pro stereo up to 384 kbit/s
    - WMA Lossless stereo up to 384 kbit/s
    - Advanced Audio Coding (AAC)(.mp4, .m4a, .m4b, .mov) up to 320 kbit/s
    - MP3 (.mp3): up to 320 kbit/s
- Video Support:
  - CBR or VBR for:
    - WMV Main and Simple Profile
    - MPEG-4 Part 2 Advanced Simple Profile up to 2.5 Mbit/s bit rate
    - H.264 Baseline profile up to 2.5 Mbit/s
- Picture Support:
  - JPEG (.jpg)
