= Gigabeat =

Digital media player line by Toshiba

The Gigabeat was a line of digital media players by Toshiba.

== Gigabeat ==
The Gigabeat was first called the MobilPhile and later renamed to Gigabeat. It contained a monochrome LCD with blue backlighting, and a 5 GB removable PCMCIA hard drive. Its case was made of aluminum, and battery life is specified at 18 hours. It required music to be converted using the Toshiba Audio Application to an encrypted format. It has a circular D-pad surrounding a smaller circular play/pause button, 2 menu buttons, side-mounted volume up/down buttons and a lock switch.

== Gigabeat G ==
The Gigabeat G was first introduced during the Japanese WPC Expo in September 2003. The hard drive player features capacities from 5 GB to 40 GB, support for MP3, WMA and WAV sound files, USB 2.0, and integration with Windows Media Player. The device has a 160x86-pixel monochromic screen with blue backlighting. Battery life is specified at 11 hours. It is only available in Japan.

The Gigabeat G was updated and branded as the G21. This version offered some new features such as LAN addressing.

== Gigabeat F ==
The Gigabeat F was released in September 2004. The hard drive player is available in capacities from 10 to 60 GB, and has a 2.2" 16-bit TFT LCD screen with a QVGA resolution. Battery life lasts up to 16 hours, and reportedly 19 hours if the backlight is set to 5 seconds. The Gigabeat F introduced a new controller called "Plustouch" which is a touch sensitive control system on a plus-shaped pad. Like the Gigabeat G, the player supports MP3, WMA (as well as protected WMA format), and WAV, but encrypts all uploaded files to a special SAT format.

In November 2005, Toshiba released simultaneous upgrades to the Gigabeat F's firmware and the Gigabeat Room software. An English version was released in March 2006. Problems with image transferring and distortion were solved, and an equalizer was added to the player.

The Gigabeat F is a popular candidate for alternative firmware with its rich screen, strong processor, ample storage capacities and simple hardware customisation capabilities. It is compatible with all Toshiba 1.8" hard drives (up to 80 GB with the original firmware, more with third party firmware), can take iPod replacement batteries with little or no modification, and is capable of running the Rockbox digital audio player firmware.

== Gigabeat X ==
The Gigabeat X was an update to the F series; changes included the dropping of the 40 GB version for a 30 GB version, and a 16-hour battery life. The X-series has a larger 2.4" 16-bit TFT LCD, which enables it to display images. It also has a smaller body (similar to the future Gigabeat S) and raised Plustouch pad. It was sold primarily in Australia and various Asian countries.

== Gigabeat P ==
The Gigabeat P series players are Toshiba's first attempt at entering the flash-based Digital audio player (DAP) market.

The player features a 1.1-inch, 16-bit OLED screen of a resolution of 96 by 96 pixels and comes in two different capacities. The P5 is available in two different colour variations and is the 512 MB model, whereas the P10 is only available in 1 GB in black. Both types support MP3, WMA, and WAV, and includes a built-in FM tuner.

=== Special editions ===
The Gigabeat P5S is a Japanese-only, 512 MB model of the Gigabeat P that was released in July 2006 (Trapnest models) and August 2006 (Blast models), which featured custom plates of Nana characters.

== Gigabeat S ==
The Gigabeat S was released in Japan in April 2006 and in the United States on the last day of May 2006. The player was first presented at the Consumer Electronics Show in January 2006 in Las Vegas by Bill Gates in his keynote speech. It uses version 2 of the Portable Media Center interface by Microsoft and the device closely integrates with Windows Media Player 11 and the Xbox 360. The player has a 12-hour battery life for audio and plays video for up to 2.5 hours. The Gigabeat S is the first of subsequent Toshiba players that does not include Gigabeat Room to transfer and sync content, the players are now compatible with Windows Media Player.

The player offers a 2.4-inch, 16-bit TFT LCD with a QVGA resolution and storage capacities of 30 GB or 60 GB. It also has a built-in FM tuner and audio support for MP3, WAV, WMA (both lossy and lossless), while the player natively supports WMV. Other video formats such as MPEG-4, AVI and QuickTime are only supported through transcoding. The device is also PlaysForSure-certified, which means that it is compatible with online stores like Napster To Go.

The Gigabeat S also has a USB Host for downloading images directly off digital cameras without the need of a computer, while connecting the player to a TV needs an optional composite TV-out cable.

On March 3, 2009, Toshiba released a firmware update which upgrades the Platform to 1.3 (from 1.1). There are no release notes and the changes are unknown.

=== Criticism ===
Some users have encountered a problem when the player deletes all media on its hard drive after being disconnected from USB sync with a computer. Although Microsoft's Zune is based on the hardware of this player, it is not affected due to a different firmware. This problem has been left unresolved; it is not known whether the March 2009 update resolves this issue.

== Gigabeat V ==
The Gigabeat V, released in October 2006 in a capacity of 30 GB, is Toshiba's first attempt at a portable media player. Although the device is larger, with a 3.5-inch TFT LCD screen, the Gigabeat V shares the same interface, media formats, and internal hardware design as the Gigabeat S. It is bundled with a USB cable, an A/V output jack, and a custom splitter cable. The player has a 30-hour battery life for audio and 8 hours for video. Unlike many other portable media players, the Gigabeat V lacks the ability to charge through USB.

The Japanese version includes recording audio and 1seg TV programming.

=== Second-generation ===
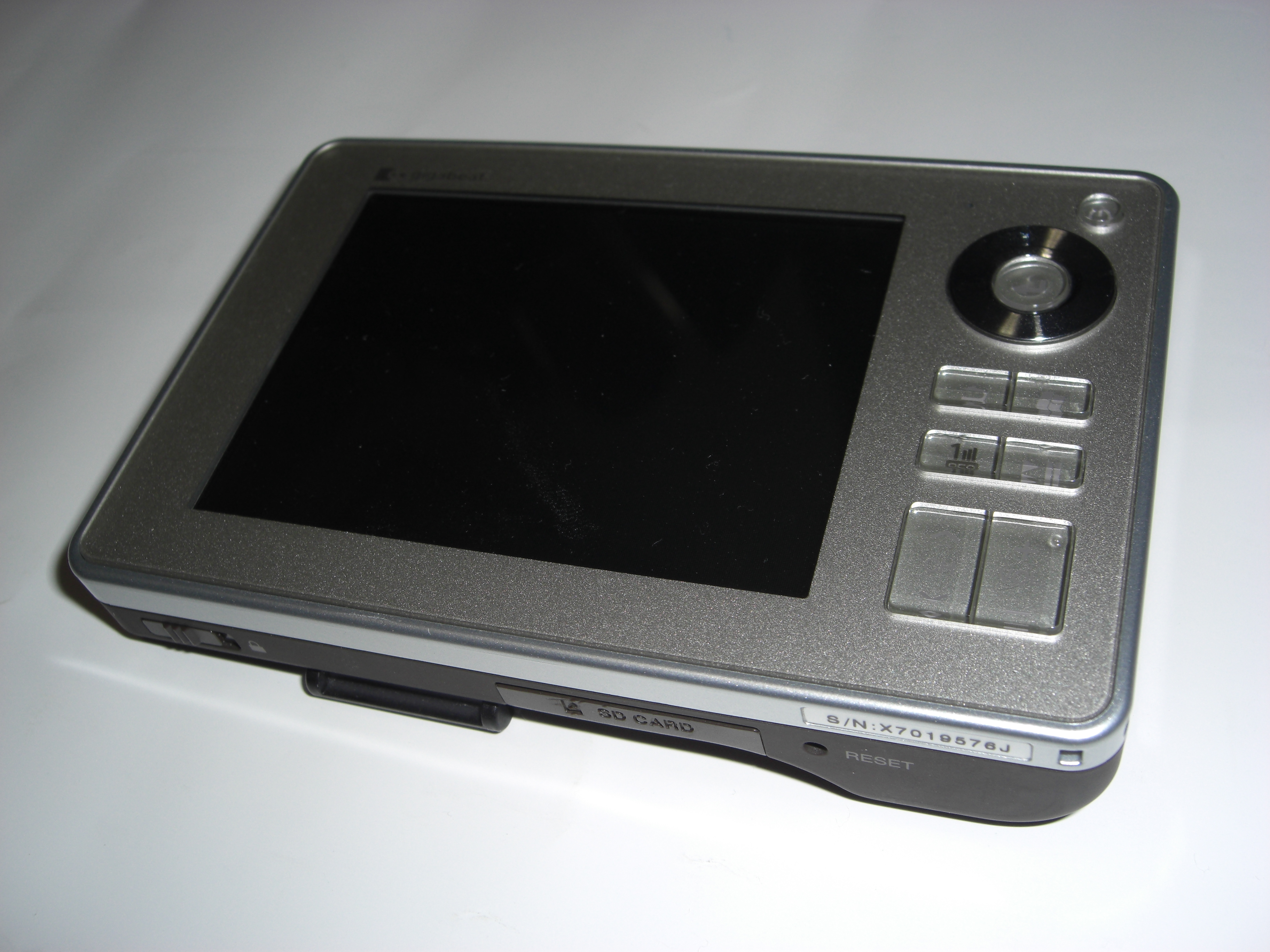
Gigabeat V41

A new version of the Gigabeat V was released on June 1, 2007 in Japan. It supports a 4-inch widescreen with a resolution of 480 x 272 pixels, and is available in capacities of 40 GB and 80 GB. The player's battery life is rated at about 28 hours for audio, and 10 hours for video. It also has a 1seg TV tuner. There was no word on when this version was coming to the US.

== Gigabeat U ==
On March 19, 2007, Toshiba announced a new line of players called the Gigabeat U, available in capacities of 1 GB and 2 GB. The flash-based player has a 1.1-inch OLED display and is the first Gigabeat to have an FM tuner, recorder and transmitter, and the first DAP to include a 1-bit digital-analog converter. A charge of ten minutes will enable the Gigabeat U to play music for three hours, and battery life lasts up to 20 hours. The player supports WMA (lossy and protected), MP3, and uncompressed WAV. It is currently available in Japan and the United States.

== Gigabeat T ==
MET401

The Gigabeat MET401 from 2007 includes Wi-Fi (b+g) capabilities and runs Windows Embedded. The model MET401s has no WiFi capabilities. Its hardware is largely based on the same Freescale i.MX31 CPU as the Gigabeat S and V.

This model comes with a 2.4" QVGA screen, 4 GB of flash memory, and Toshiba's H2C Technology (High order Harmonic Compensation Technology) for lossy audio compensation as first featured in the second generation V series.

== See also ==
- Digital audio player
- Portable Media Center
- Portable media player
- Toshiba
- Rockbox (alternative, open source firmware for the Gigabeat F, X and S series)
- Zune Microsoft rebranded Gigabeat 1089
