= Zune Social =

Defunct social network

Zune Social was the online component of Microsoft's Zune initiative. It was a social networking website that displayed a user's most-played artists, favorite and recently played songs, a list of the users friends, what the user's friends were listening to, and any comments about them. It has been compared to iLike and Last.fm in that it tracked and displayed, or "scrobbled", songs that the user had played.

An example Zune Card of Zune blogger Cesar Menendez (a.k.a. "Zune Insider")

The central component of Social was the Zune Card. It was a Flash-based widget that could be embedded on other sites and social networking pages (Myspace, Facebook, etc.). It showcased the user's most recently played songs, their most played artists and number of times that artist had been played, and a user-selected list of favorite songs. Clicking a song, artist, or album would bring up the respective page on the Social website. Select songs had an option to preview a 30-second clip, and users could download the song via Zune Marketplace, suggest the song to a friend, or add it as one of their favorites.

In May 2008, Microsoft added reputation badges to users' Zune Cards, which could be earned by having listened to an album or artist a certain number of times, or by making helpful posts in the Zune forums. In addition, Zune Cards could be synced with user's devices; subscribers to Zune Pass could in this way download all the songs on their friends' cards.

Comparisons to Microsoft's Xbox Live Gamertag were inevitable, as the two services use the same back-end. They differed in that the Gamercard showed the user's recently played games, while the Zune Card displayed recently played songs. Users signed into the service via Windows Live ID and could link their Gamertag and Zune tag so that friends on Xbox Live would carry over to the other service.

Plays were recorded on both the device and software, and the software sent play updates by default every 15 minutes. Songs played on the device were recorded during the sync process, though the order they show up on the Zune Card was a result of the sync order (not play order). Only albums that were in AMG and Zune Marketplace were shown, and plays were kept in the database for 28 days only.

== Zune Social Badges ==
If a user listened to an artist or album enough times, Zune awarded that user a badge. Users also earned badges for contributing useful information to the Zune.net forums and for reviews.

Album Power Listener

- Bronze - 200 or more plays
- Silver - 1,000 or more plays
- Gold - 5,000 or more plays

Artist Power Listener

- Bronze - 200 or more plays
- Silver -1,000 or more plays
- Gold - 5,000 or more plays

Forums Contributor

- Bronze - 10 or more posts rated highly
- Silver - 25 or more posts rated highly
- Gold - 50 or more posts rated highly

Reviews Contributor

- Bronze - 10 or more reviews rated highly
- Silver - 20 or more reviews rated highly
- Gold - 50 or more reviews rated highly

Badges did not expire.

== Similar services ==
- Batanga
- Deezer
- iLike
- Jamendo
- MeeMix
- MOG
- Musicovery
- Pandora Radio
- Slacker
