= Portable Media Center =

Defunct platform

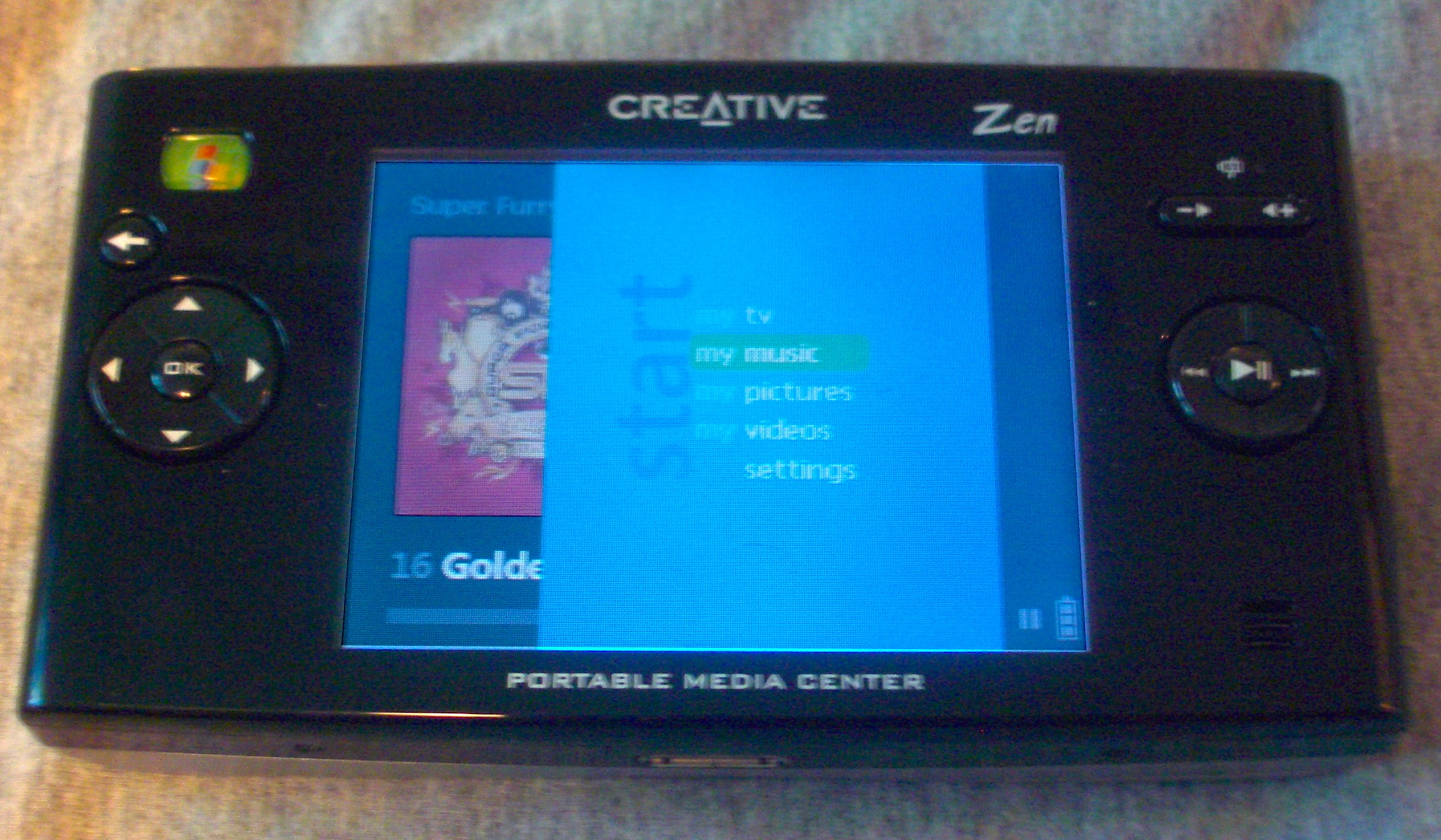
The Zen Portable Media Center by Creative, which was the first player based on PMC

Portable Media Center (PMC) is a portable media player (PMP) platform developed by Microsoft. Announced at the 2003 Consumer Electronics Show (CES), and released in early 2004, it was originally positioned as a competitor to Apple's iPod. All its hard drive-based players use a graphical user interface (GUI) modeled after Media Center, a software portal bundled with Windows XP Media Center Edition. Manufacturers of PMC devices included Creative, Philips, iriver, Samsung, and Toshiba.

== History ==
The platform was conceived in line with Microsoft's Windows Media Center strategy, where the idea was to have a single media management interface that would be used on both PCs and in consumer devices, including televisions and handhelds. The strategy was developed by Microsoft's Windows Embedded group in partnership with the eHome Division, which formed in February 2001 and started partnerships with companies like Samsung with the goal to "develop new technologies so consumers can enjoy whole-home entertainment, communications and control experiences where, when and however they want them" and "develop an entire ecosystem of PCs, digital devices, intelligent home appliances and services that will easily and cost-effectively transform average households into next-generation digital homes." The Windows Media Center name was created with the release of a Windows XP product edition, Windows XP Media Center Edition, geared towards this ecosystem.

Codenamed Media2Go, it was later rebranded as Windows Mobile software for Portable Media Centers, before being named Portable Media Center.

The Portable Media Center was succeeded by Zune, and served as the basis for its software. Zune had similar aims to provide a unifying media platform across PCs, devices, and televisions (3-screen strategy).

== Software ==
Its operating system was a specialized version of Windows CE. In 2007, Microsoft discontinued licensing the platform.

All PMCs are able to play audio files in MP3 and display images in JPEG. Also, they support Microsoft's proprietary formats: Windows Media Audio (WMA) and Windows Media Video (WMV). Other video formats will either be supported by each individual PMC, or transcoded though Windows Media Player. Media Transfer Protocol (MTP) is used for transferring data.

== See also ==
- Portable media player
- Windows Media Center
- Windows Mobile
- Pocket PC
- Zune
