= Microsoft Kin =

Former mobile phone line by Microsoft

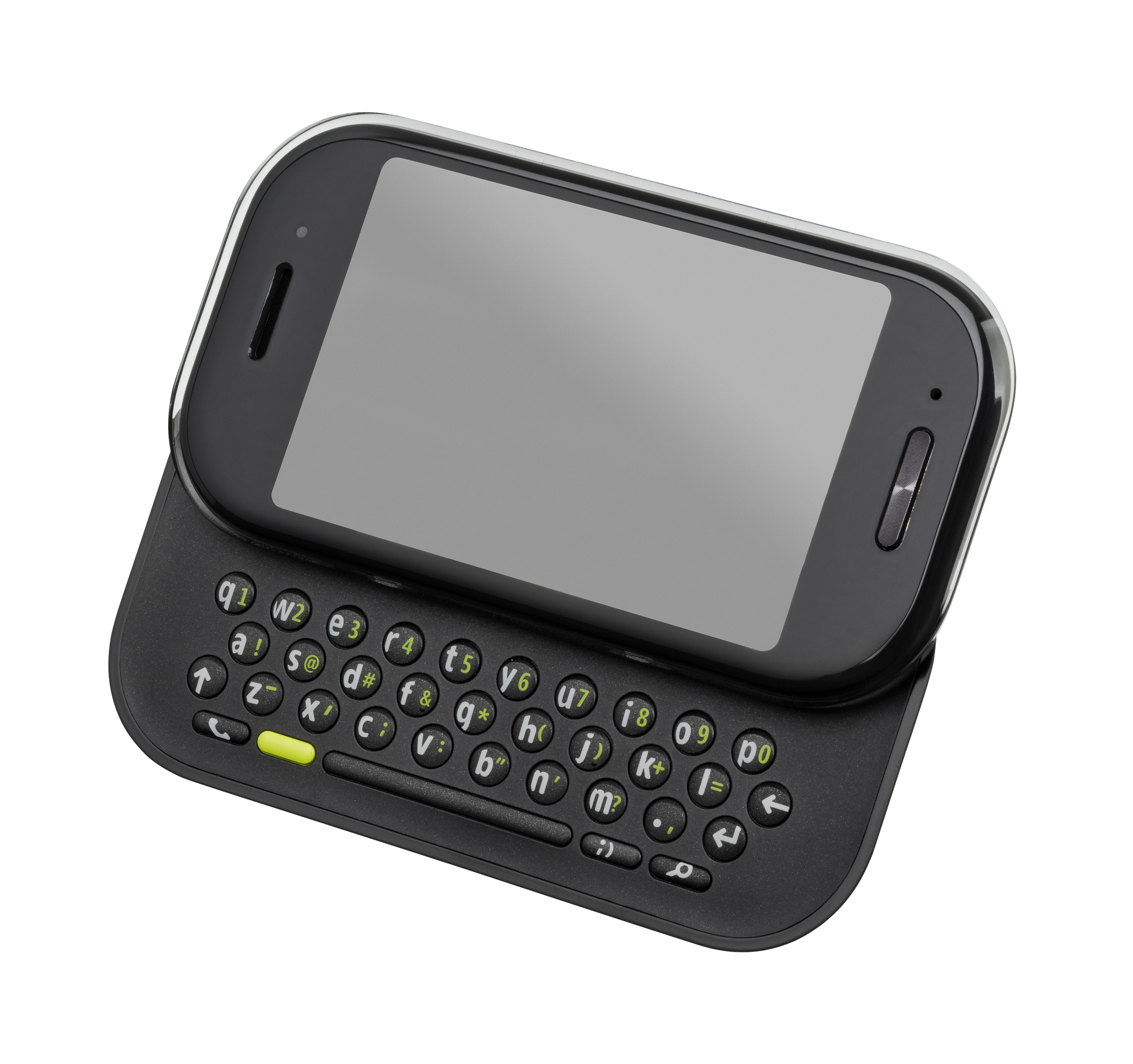
- The Kin Two, shown open
- Developer: Microsoft
- Manufacturer: Sharp
- First released: April 12, 2010
- Availability by region: May–June 2010 (ONE, TWO); December 2010 (ONEm, TWOm)
- Compatible networks: CDMA
- Form factor: Slider/Texting phone
- Dimensions: ONE: 3.25 in × 2.5 in × 0.75 in (8.3 cm × 6.4 cm × 1.9 cm), TWO: 4.25 in × 2.5 in × 0.75 in (10.8 cm × 6.4 cm × 1.9 cm)
- Weight: ONE: 110 g (3.9 oz), TWO: 130 g (4.6 oz)
- Operating system: KIN OS (based on Windows CE)
- CPU: Freescale i. MX31L processor ARM Core nVidia Tegra APX 2600
- Memory: 256 MB DDR RAM
- Storage: ONE: 4 GB, TWO: 8 GB, KIN Studio (unlimited)
- Rear camera: ONE: 5 MP, TWO: 8 MP
- Display: ONE: 2.6 in (6.6 cm), TWO: 3.4 in (8.6 cm)
- Media: Zune
- Connectivity: EV-DO Rev, Wi-Fi, Bluetooth 2.1
- Data inputs: QWERTY keyboard, Capacitive multi-touch
- Development status: Discontinued

Kin was a line of mobile phones that was briefly marketed by Microsoft in 2010. Aimed at people between ages 15 and 30, they were designed for social networking. Microsoft invested two years and about US$1 billion developing the Kin platform, beginning with its acquisition of Danger Incorporated, creators of the Hiptop or T-Mobile Sidekick. The Kin ran an operating system based on Windows CE. They were manufactured by Sharp Corporation and sold through Verizon Wireless.

The Kin ONE and TWO went on the market on May 14, 2010. Within two months, Verizon stopped selling the phones because of poor sales. Microsoft scrapped its planned European release, stopped promoting the devices, ceased production, and reassigned the Kin development team to other projects. Microsoft updated its unsold Kin inventory with firmware that removed social and web-based features, and in December 2010 offered these re-purposed units through Verizon stores as limited feature phones, the Kin ONEm and the TWOm. The Kin TWOm was discontinued in August 2011; unsold inventory could still be found for sale on deals sites as late as June 2013.

== History ==
=== Development ===
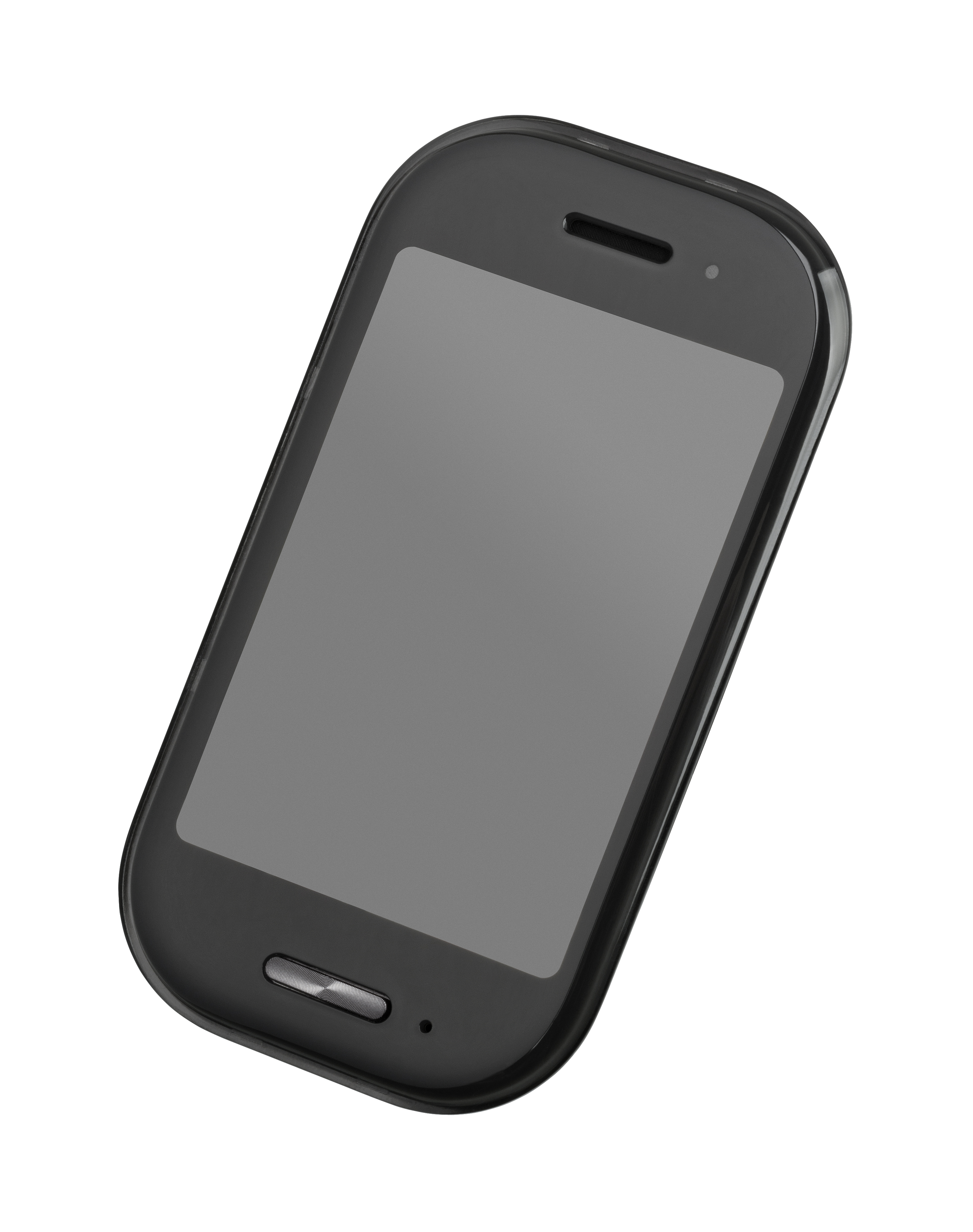
The Kin Two shown closed

The Kin project was first known by the codename Project Pink, and began under direction of Microsoft executive J Allard. In order to gain a head start, Microsoft acquired Danger Incorporated, which built the Danger Hiptop/T-Mobile Sidekick, in 2008 for a purchase price rumored to be around US$500 million. In September 2009, a ZDNet source reported that Project Pink would bring an entirely new software stack and services. Some reports predicted that the new mobile phone platform would be based on the Zune media device. The project was managed by Roz Ho, a corporate vice president at Microsoft. Internally, the team used the slogan "Truly Madly Deeply Pink"; in tweets they used the hashtag "#tmdp".

Kin was developed inside Microsoft's Premium Mobile Experiences (PMX) division by a group that included staff from Danger. Handset manufacturers and network carriers were said to be initially enthusiastic about Kin, and vying with each other to be involved with the project.

According to Engadget, there was jealousy and rivalry in Microsoft's executive ranks, and Windows Phone senior vice president Andy Lees managed to wrest control of the Kin project away from Allard, and move it under his Windows Phone division. Danger's Sidekick, the predecessor to Kin, was based on the Java programming language, but Engadget says that Lees wanted Kin to run an in-house Microsoft operating system. Microsoft planned to base Kin on Windows Phone. Due to delays with Windows Phone, however, the software instead had to be based directly upon Windows CE.

Engadget claims that Lees lacked enthusiasm for the Kin project. Nonetheless, Microsoft spent a further two years developing the Kin until its release in 2010.

=== Unveiling ===
The unveiling of Microsoft Kin began when the company sent out invitations to select reporters for a mystery event in San Francisco on April 12, 2010. The tagline on the invitation said "It's time to share". However, just hours later a source confirmed that the event was about Project Pink (the official name not having been announced yet). The event was held in a night club called Mighty and featured a presentation given by Robbie Bach, president of Microsoft's Entertainment and Device division.

Microsoft was criticized for an online video advertisement for the phone that depicted a male teenager putting a Kin under his shirt to photograph his naked chest. He was then shown sending the image to a female teenager. The Consumer Reports group described the advertisement as a "downright creepy sequence," suggesting that it promoted sexting. In response, Microsoft deleted the "inappropriate" portion of the video.

=== Discontinuation ===
Kin had poor sales. Microsoft executives told The New York Times that they were dismayed that Verizon Wireless staff were not promoting the phones actively enough. After only 48 days on the market, Microsoft discontinued the Kin line on June 30, 2010 and by mid-July 2010 Verizon had returned all their unsold phones to Microsoft. Kin's planned European release on UK carrier Vodafone was canceled.

“The Kin was a mistake from Day One,” Rob Enderle, principal analyst of Enderle Group, told eWeek magazine. “The extra time they took to convert the Kin from the Sidekick platform to Windows CE made it about a year and a half late to market, and the merger likely added another year and a half. That’s 1.5 to 3 years late depending on when you start the clock.”

=== Comeback ===
On November 18, 2010, Verizon Wireless's website confirmed that the Kin ONE and Kin TWO were back on the market with a reworked feature phone operating system, re-badged as Kin ONEm and Kin TWOm. Since the new phone did not use the kin.com website it did not require a data plan. The new version of the phone arrived at Verizon stores in December of that year. Along with the name change and re-classification as feature phones rather than smartphones, the prices of the devices were slashed, with the Kin ONEm reduced from $50 to free, and the Kin TWOm reduced from $100 to $50, with a new two-year contract.

The new feature phone OS removed the web-based and social networking integration features such as Kin Loop, Kin Spot, and Kin Studio. The newer "m" phones (identified by "m" next to the model number and two yellow dots on the corners) could be "downgraded" to the original firmware version via holding "r", "b", and "power" upon turning on the device (a procedure that also erases all the phone's stored data and settings).

The kin.com website was discontinued in January 2011, and all user pictures and other information stored on the website were deleted. Verizon offered a free trade-in to a 3G smartphone to all affected phone owners. After the Kin website shut down, the original Kin ONE and TWO lost access to the same social features that were removed from the ONEm and TWOm, making them also essentially feature phones that did not require a data plan.

== Original Kin series features ==
Microsoft described Kin devices as "social phones", straddling the feature phone and smartphone markets, with an emphasis on social networking and sharing of content, but without downloadable apps or games.

=== Social networking ===
The home screen on Kin was called Loop, and served as an aggregator for social networking connections from Facebook, Twitter, Windows Live, and MySpace as well as web content from web feeds.

Commentators noted Loop's 15-minute delay for updates, which CNET's Ina Fried described as "odd". PC World argued this delay was at odds with Microsoft's claim that the phone is "always-connected". Users could not adjust this interval, although updates could be manually triggered with an on-screen refresh button, or locking then unlocking the phone. Microsoft cited battery life and immature social networking APIs as reasons for the delay; Engadget speculated that Microsoft may have been using the delayed messaging to encourage Verizon to offer lower-priced data plans, which would be attractive to the platform's teenage target audience.

Kin did not support uploading photos or videos to Twitter. Retweets, direct messages, viewing single person updates, and opening Twitter links from the Loop were also not supported.

=== Spot ===
Spot was a feature that allowed users to add an e-mail address or telephone number to an SMS or MMS, or to attach content (e.g., text, URLs or photos) to emails.

The Spot was represented as an omnipresent colored dot near the bottom center of the screen. To add an address field, the user dragged a recipient's photo to the Spot, then clicked on the Spot, opening a page that allowed the user to create a new email, SMS or MMS.

The Spot could also be used to set up e-mail attachments, by the user dragging the content to the Spot, then dragged the recipient's photo to the Spot, after which an email could be sent containing those attachments. However, Kin did not support attachments to non-e-mail media such as MMS and could not be used to send content to social media sites.

=== Cloud storage ===
Content from the Kin phone, such as photos, videos and messages, was automatically synchronized to a cloud service called Kin Studio, and would then be accessible via a browser on other devices. The Kin Studio website was written in Silverlight and its appearance was similar to the Kin UI, even including a Spot for sharing content. Kin Studio was shut down in January 2011.

=== Camera ===
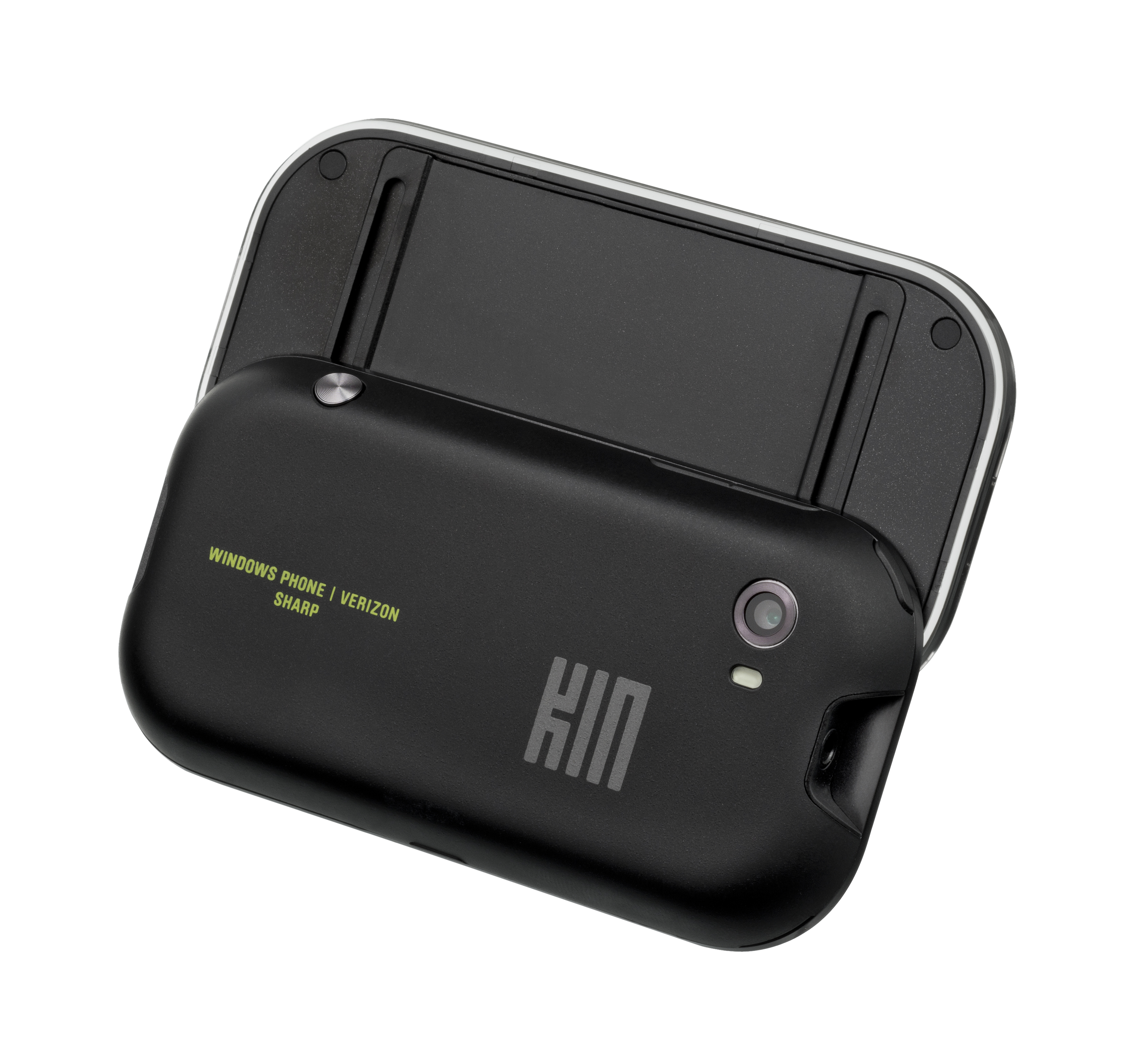
The Kin Two included an 8 megapixel camera.

The Kin ONE had a five-megapixel camera with standard-definition video recording capabilities. The Kin TWO included an eight-megapixel camera with 720p video recording. Photos were automatically geocoded on the original phones, a feature disabled on the "m" phones. There was no photo editing software for Kin.

=== Media playback ===
For media, Kin devices synced with Zune desktop software. In addition, the phones were compatible with Zune Pass. Much like contemporaneous Zune devices, Kin phones could also stream music over a WiFi connection in addition to 3G on the carrier's network. For Mac users, Microsoft, in collaboration with Mark/Space, provided a media syncing tool that pulled audio and video files from iTunes and photos from iPhoto. Kin did not support playing video from sites such as YouTube or Hulu, although users could watch YouTube videos from the browser through WiFi or 3G.

=== Applications ===
Kin had no app store and no third-party apps could be installed on the phones. PC World described this as "baffling". Further, the web browser did not support Flash web applications, and there were no games for the phones. Microsoft had stated their intention to eventually merge the Kin and Windows Phone platforms, with downloadable apps then being available for the combined platform.

=== Missing features ===
Reviewers highlighted a number of notable omissions from Kin's initial feature set:

- Contact lists could only be copied from another phone by Verizon store employees. There was no way for the consumer to do this by any known means (over the air, via a memory or SIM card, wirelessly via Bluetooth and vCard, or via direct USB cable connection).
- Kin had no calendar or appointment application, nor any ability to sync with Outlook calendar or Google Calendar. Some commentators suggested that a social phone should be able to share a social events calendar.
- Kin was unable to Instant Message (IM), or use any IM client, which was considered odd for a phone built for messaging and aimed at the youth market. It was discovered that the ROM inside the phones contained the foundation for an IM system supporting AOL Instant Messenger, Windows Live Messenger, and Yahoo! Messenger, but it was never made operational. It was speculated that future revisions of the software would have enabled instant messaging.
- There was no spelling correction or predictive text input.

=== Network charges ===
In the United States, cellular telephone provider Verizon Wireless sold the Kin phones with a voice plan starting at $39.99 per month. An optional Zune Pass cost $14.99 per month for music access.

After the kin.com website was discontinued in January 2011, the original Kin ONE and Kin TWO did not require a data plan, although the optional Zune Pass was still available.

=== Relationship to Windows Phone ===
The Microsoft Kin has been described as a "close cousin" to Windows Phone, with shared user interface characteristics. According to Microsoft, "Both KIN and Windows Phone share common OS components, software and services. We will seek to align around a single platform for both products as well as consistent hardware specifications."

Microsoft said that the underlying fundamentals of Kin and Windows Phone were held together by similar core technologies. Both operating systems ran the same Silverlight platform, with Microsoft's stated intention being to eventually merge Windows Phone with Kin.

== Kin "m" series features ==
In November 2010, Microsoft and Verizon re-launched the Kin phones, re-labeling them as feature phones with no required data plan. The prices of the phones also were slashed. Where the Kin TWO was formerly $100 on a two-year contract, the new Kin TWOm was offered at $20 on contract. Similarly, the Kin ONE, formerly $50 on a contract, was now free on contract.

The new firmware on the repurposed "m" phones removed several data-centric features of the operating system, including many of the devices' social elements such as the Loop home screen, the Spot, and access to the Kin Studio cloud storage site, which was shut down in January 2011. With the lack of a data plan requirement and lower prices up front, Microsoft and Verizon hoped to do what they originally planned: capture the teenage market.

=== Zune music ===
One seemingly data-laden feature of the old Kin devices which remained available for the repurposed phones was Zune Pass, although it was now able to stream music only over Wi-Fi, even when customers had 3G data enabled, to conserve data. This was done to accommodate Verizon's new tiered data plans, which marked the end of unlimited data for users.

Users were also able to sync music, podcasts, TV shows, and movies to their Kin phones through the Zune software. Music could be downloaded directly to the phones as well, though only over Wi-Fi. Podcasts, TV shows, and movies could only be synced to the phone via the Zune Software on a Windows PC.

=== New features ===
The "m" series added a calendar and a calculator application, to address complaints that these were missing functions that even the most basic feature phone typically has. Although the calendar application had basic features such as timed alerts and reminders, as well as day, month, and year views, it could not be synchronized with Microsoft Outlook, Microsoft Exchange, or even Windows Live Hotmail.

=== Missing features ===
Along with the discontinued social networking features, the phones no longer geocoded pictures. Other features missing on the original version continued to be absent, including disallowing Bluetooth access for file transfer and wireless printing.

The Kin TWOm was unable to forward previously sent messages. Text messages were sent in a chat style format, making it unable to single out a specific text message.

=== Browser ===
"The KIN uses a proprietary browser made specifically for the KIN. No other browsers can be used or downloaded. Silverlight was used for the creation of the KIN studio, not the browser." The browser identified itself as "IEMobile 6.12." The full user agent string was:

Mozilla/4.0 (compatible; MSIE 6.0; Windows CE; IEMobile 6.12; en-US; KIN.Two 1.0)

== Devices ==
=== Kin ONE and ONEm ===
- Originally codenamed Turtle
- QWERTY keyboard that slides up and lies on top of the phone
- 2.6" TFT, QVGA (320 x 240) Display
- Capacitive touch screen
- 5-megapixel camera, with LED flash
- 4 GB of storage, 256 MB DDR RAM
- Nvidia Tegra at 600 MHz
- Mono Speaker
- GPS
- Accelerometer
- Bluetooth 2.1 with A2DP
- Wi-Fi
- USB (for charging, syncing with Zune Software)

=== Microsoft Kin TWO and TWOm made by Sharp for Verizon ===
- Originally codenamed Pure
- Basic phone—not smartphone: no contract required
- Side-sliding QWERTY keyboard
- 3.4" TFT, HVGA (480x320) pixel display
- Capacitive touch screen
- 8-megapixel camera, with Lumi LED flash
- 720p video recording
- 8 GB of storage, 256 MB DDR RAM
- no SD expansion slot
- Nvidia Tegra at 600 MHz
- Stereo speakers
- Kin Studio, Kin Loop, and GPS software on Kin Two; removed from Kin TwoM (services are no longer available)
- Accelerometer
- Bluetooth 2.1 with A2DP
- Wi-Fi
- USB (for charging, syncing with free Zune Software)
- Two has no calculator or calendar; TwoM has both

== See also ==
- Zune HD
- Microsoft Mobile – the mobile phone line by Microsoft with acquiring from Nokia
- Microsoft Lumia
- Danger, Inc.
- List of defunct consumer brands
