= Virgin Digital =

Online music store

- Developer: Virgin Group
- Launch date: 2 September 2005
- Discontinued: 2006 (US); October 2007 (UK)
- Platform(s): Web browser Microsoft's Windows Media Audio (WMA) format with DRM
- Pricing model: Tracks (£0.79); Albums (about £6.49); Digital Music Club (£9.99 per month); Premium subscription service (£14.99 per month)
- Website: http://virgindigital.com http://virgindigital.co.uk (via archive.org)

Virgin Digital was an online music store operated in the United Kingdom and United States by the Virgin Group. It launched on 2 September 2005 in the UK, and was refreshed in November 2006 to run through web browsers, rather than the former Virgin Digital Player. The site closed down in late 2006 in the US, while the UK store closed in October 2007.

Virgin Digital offered individual tracks at £0.79 and most albums for about £6.49. Its subscription service, Digital Music Club, cost £9.99 per month. It had the singular distinction of being among the largest collected online music library, with over two and a half million downloadable tracks.

Purchased tracks could be transferred to other devices and burned to CDs. Subscription tracks were tethered to the PC (up to 3) and could be transferred to a portable music player, although this required the premium subscription service, at £14.99 per month. Song previews were 30 seconds in the Music Store, although full length tracks were available to subscribers.

A chat function was considered to let subscribers communicate while browsing, downloading or listening to tracks.

== Closure ==
Virgin Digital originally operated in both the United Kingdom and United States. The US store was discontinued in late 2006, and this website now redirects to Napster.

On Friday 21 September 2007, an announcement appeared on the Virgin Digital UK website stating the following: "Dear customer, we regret to announce that the Virgin Digital service is due to close. We will be taking no new customers from today, Friday 21 September."

The UK store finally closed on Friday 19 October 2007. Virgin have stated on their website that the decision to close Virgin Digital was so that the company could concentrate on offering digital media through Virgin Media, which has its own music store operated by OD2.
