= Zune =

Microsoft's former digital media brand

- Product type: Digital media
- Current owner: Microsoft
- Country: United States
- Introduced: 2006
- Discontinued: 2012
- Related brands: Xbox and Windows Phone (successor)
- Markets: Worldwide

12 Oct 2004	MSN Music Store launches
18 Oct 2006	Release of version 11 of Windows Media Player playback software
22 Nov 2006	Zune Marketplace and Xbox Live Video Marketplace launches offering music and video downloads respectively
19 Nov 2008	Zune Pass music subscription service launches
22 Jul 2009	Release of version 12 of Windows Media Player playback software
Fall 2009	Zune Marketplace gains movies and TV content; Xbox Live Video Marketplace integrates into new Zune Video Marketplace
26 Oct 2012	Zune brand retired; Xbox Music and Xbox Video streaming services and download stores launches; Xbox Music and Xbox Video apps also replace Windows Media Player as the default media playback software (in Windows 8)
29 Jul 2015	Xbox Music and Xbox Video apps and streaming services re-branded as Groove Music and Movies & TV/Films & TV respectively; Music and Video download stores merged into the Windows Store (later known as Microsoft Store)
1 Jan 2018	Discontinuation and shutting down of Groove Music streaming service (Pass) and music downloading from the Microsoft Store
16 Nov 2021	Release of new Media Player software replacing Groove Music and (for playback purposes) Movies & TV/Films & TV
18 Jul 2025	Microsoft Movies & TV/Films & TV store shuts down, ending Microsoft's presence in digital music/video distribution

Zune is a discontinued brand of digital media products and services that was marketed by Microsoft from November 2006 until it was discontinued in June 2012. Zune consisted of a line of portable media players, featuring Zune Music Pass, a music subscription service, and Zune Marketplace for music, TV and movies, streaming services for the Xbox 360 game console, and the Zune software media player for Windows computers which also acted as desktop sync software for Windows Phone.

Zune started and revolved around its line of portable media players (PMP) created in cooperation with Toshiba. Microsoft aimed to challenge and beat Apple, whose iPod line held an enormous market share. Three hard disk players ranging from 30 GB to 120 GB were released, alongside six flash players. However, its overall market share in the U.S. remained low, well below Apple and also lagged behind the SanDisk Sansa and Creative Zen. Microsoft discontinued all Zune hardware in October 2011. Zune digital content distribution continued until 2012, when it was replaced by the Xbox Music and Xbox Video brands.

== Predecessors ==
Zune music and devices were follow-on to Microsoft's MSN Music service. MSN Music was created in 2004 to compete with Apple's iTunes services and used the Microsoft PlaysForSure DRM protocol. After only two years, Microsoft announced the closing of MSN Music in 2006 immediately before announcing the Zune service without PlaysForSure support. In 2008, Microsoft shut down the MSN Music licensing servers for PlaysForSure only two years after promising users the servers would be available for five years.

The Portable Media Center platform was also a predecessor of Zune, based on a specialized version of Windows CE.

== Zune hardware players ==
Zune
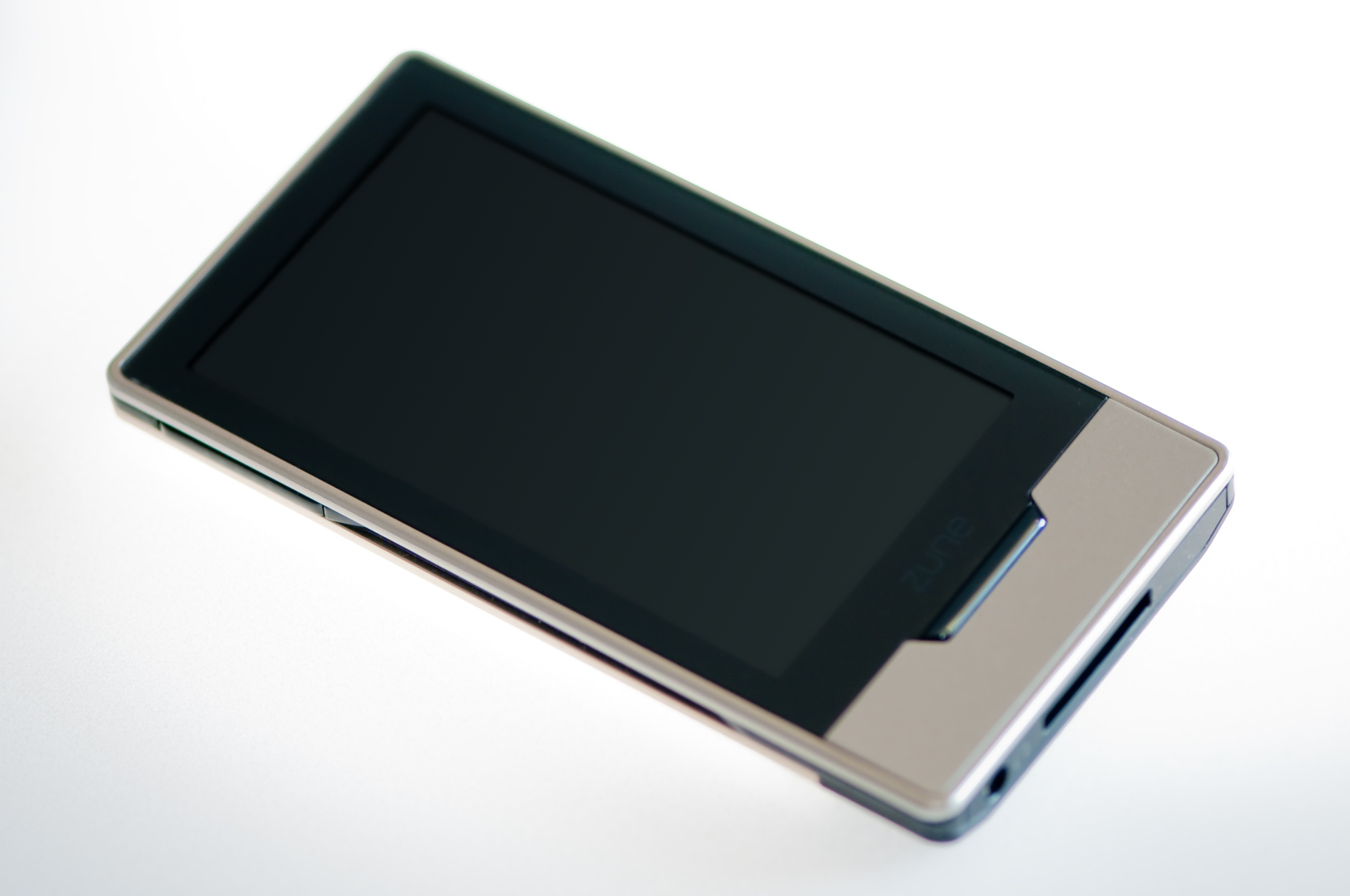
- A Zune HD, the last portable media player in the Zune line
- Manufacturer: Microsoft
- Type: Digital media, Portable media player
- Released: November 14, 2006 (Zune 30) November 13, 2007 (Zune 4, 8, 80); June 13, 2008 (Zune 4, 8, 80) September 16, 2008 (Zune 16, 120); September 15, 2009 (Zune HD 16, 32) April 12, 2010 (Zune HD 64)
- Lifespan: 2006–2011 (United States); 2008–2011 (Canada); 2010–2011 (Mexico, Brazil, Australia, New Zealand and select markets of Europe and Asia)
- Discontinued: October 2011
- Operating system: Windows Embedded CE 6.0
- CPU: Freescale i.MX31L processor ARM Core; Nvidia Tegra APX 2600 (Zune HD)
- Storage: 4, 8, 16, 32, and 64 GB flash drive 30, 80, and 120 GB hard drive
- Display: 1.8in glass LCD screen, resolution 240×320 (Zune 4, 8, 16); 3in QVGA LCD screen, resolution 240×320 (Zune 30); 3.2in glass LCD screen, resolution 240×320 at 4:3 aspect ratio (Zune 80, 120); 3.3in glass OLED touchscreen, resolution 480×272 at 16:9 aspect ratio (Zune HD)
- Touchpad: Circular directional pad (non-touch) (30 GB release); Touch-sensitive Zune Pad (4, 8, 16, 80, 120 GB releases); Capacitive touchscreen (HD release)
- Connectivity: Wi-Fi (Zune-Zune, Sync-PC, Microsoft Surface); USB
- Current firmware: "ZuneUpdate.com". Zune 30 (Ver. 3.3); Zune 4, 8, 16 (Ver. 3.3); Zune 80, 120 (Ver. 3.3); Zune HD 16, 32, 64 (Ver. 4.5)
- Online services: Zune Marketplace
- Predecessor: Portable Media Center
- Successor: Groove Music and Microsoft Movies & TV, Windows Phone 8

=== First generation ===
The first-generation Zune device was created by Microsoft in close cooperation with Toshiba, which took the design of the Gigabeat S and redeveloped it under the name Toshiba 1089 as registered with the Federal Communications Commission (FCC) starting in 2006. Xbox 360 overseer J Allard ran the project, codenamed "Argo", staffed with Xbox and MSN Music Store developers who worked on "Alexandria", finalized as Zune Marketplace. Both products were later united under the Zune brand name in the U.S. market. While some features were praised, the initial Zune has been regarded with derision and jokes for its bulky size and brown color, with CNET regarding it at best as a "high-profile underdog alternative to Apple's iPod" where other Windows Media MP3 players from Creative, iriver, and Samsung had not succeeded.

At midnight on December 31, 2008, many first generation Zune 30 models froze. Microsoft stated that the problem was caused by the internal clock driver written by Freescale and the way the device handles a leap year. It automatically fixed itself 24 hours later, but an intermediate "fix", for those who did not wish to wait, was to drain the device's battery and then recharge after 12 noon GMT on January 1, 2009.

The first generation and later Zune devices included a number of social features, including the ability to share songs with other Zune users wirelessly. Songs that had been transferred over Wi-Fi could then be played three times over three days.

=== Second generation ===
The first wave of the second-generation (Zune 4, 8, and 80, manufactured by Flextronics), introduced the touch-sensitive Zune Pad, which was shaped like a squircle. The 4 and 8 GB Zune devices use flash memory and are smaller in size than the 80 GB version, which uses a hard drive. The 30 GB Zune was not redesigned, although it received a software update that brought its interface in line with the second generation models. At the same time, the Zune 2.0 software was released for Windows PCs. This version of the software was completely re-written and featured a new user interface.

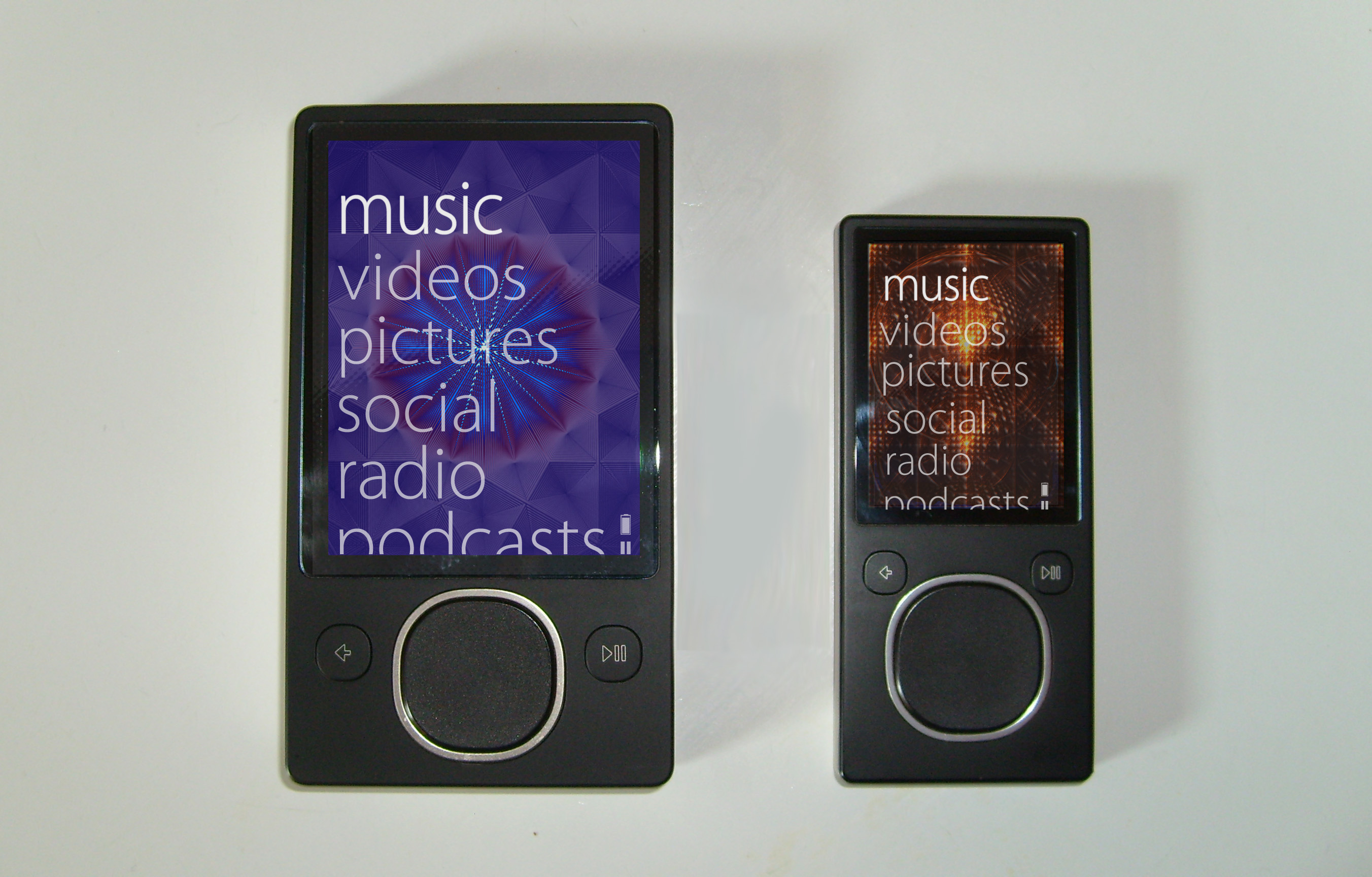
Zune 30/80/120 and Zune 4/8/16 menu system

Zune devices feature games developed using an early version of XNA Game Studio 3.0, released in May 2008, allowed developers to work on games for Zune devices.

The second and last wave of the second-generation (Zune 16 and 120) released in September 2008, coinciding with the release of the Zune Software 3.0 update. Included in this firmware update was the ability to tag and later purchase songs heard on FM radio, channels which can be customized to deliver suggested songs for the user, the games Hexic and Texas Hold' em were added, support for audiobooks from online stores such as Audible.com and others that support OverDrive media files, a clock, and changed quicklist functionality. The ability to purchase songs from Zune Marketplace on the device while connected to the Internet via Wi-Fi was also introduced. To help push this feature, Microsoft partnered with Wayport to allow Zune devices to access its network of over 10,000 wireless hotspots, including those at McDonald's restaurants.

Zune Pass customers in the United States could also now download 10 tracks to keep per month in addition to the existing subscription-dependent unlimited music downloads.

=== Third generation ===
The first wave of the third-generation (Zune HD 16 GB and 32 GB) released in September 2009. On the same day, the 4.0 software update of the desktop software was released to support the new devices. In addition, it became possible for Zune Pass subscribers to stream tracks through a computer's web browser. Zune 4.0 also supports internet radio streams but this feature is disabled by default and can only be enabled by a third-party patch. This device release marked the first time Zune firmware was released for the Zune line that did not provide new features for older models. These models were given a firmware update as version 3.2.

The second and last wave of the third-generation (Zune HD 64 GB) released in April 2010. The same day, desktop and firmware updates introduced SmartDJ and codec features. The firmware update brought picks and improved the TV-out experience on the Zune HD.

In a summer 2010, United Airlines started to offer Zune in-flight audio by means of 21 playlists that were similar to the Zune Channels offered on the Zune Marketplace. Each channel offered up to three hours of unique programming ranging from classic rock, contemporary pop, opera, electronica, piano jazz, and others.

=== Discontinuation of Zune hardware ===
On March 15, 2011, Microsoft announced that no new Zune hardware players would be developed, although existing models would remain for sale. The Zune had failed to capture significant market share after five years against the Apple iPod, and a study by NPD Group indicated that the Zune did not make the list of the five best-selling portable music players in the U.S. The iPod had been more successful because of simplicity and had better ratings. There was a much larger trend that standalone music players were giving way to smartphones with personalized, app-driven music.

On October 3, 2011, Microsoft announced the discontinuation of all Zune hardware, encouraging users to transition to Windows Phone. Later, the announcement was removed and a Zune Support Team member posted on Twitter that the discontinuation page was added to the website in error. Finally, despite previous denials, the original announcement of the Zune hardware's discontinuation was restored to the Zune Support site.

== On other Microsoft products ==
=== Xbox 360 ===
In Autumn 2009, movies and TV shows became available through streaming or download through Zune Video Marketplace on Xbox 360. On November 4, 2010, the music portion of the Zune Marketplace was brought to Xbox. This coincided with the launch of the Kinect, and Kinect owners can navigate the application menus using hand gestures, without a controller. Users must have a Zune Pass subscription to play music in the application, and only Zune Pass content is available. Locally saved music must still be played through the Xbox's native media library.

=== Microsoft mobile phones ===
Starting with the Microsoft KIN ONE and KIN TWO mid 2010, the Zune music services and features from the Zune HD became available on Microsoft's mobile phones. Shortly following the failure of the KIN line, Windows Phone 7 released and included the same Zune music app that was present on KIN. December of that same year, the rerelease of the KIN phones (whose names were denoted simply with "m" as ONEm and TWOm) yet again included the Zune music app, though the phones themselves were now feature-phones instead of smartphones. Each of these first generation Windows Phone smartphones were supported by the Zune desktop software in addition to the Zune devices.

Microsoft announced and released new versions of the Zune devices once a year until 2010. In March 2011, Bloomberg.com published an article claiming that Microsoft would stop introducing new versions of the Zune music and video player. The article has been widely quoted over the Internet and by news agencies. However, a Microsoft representative for Zune business development denied this rumor saying that the Windows Phone platform introduction should be considered to be the annual Zune update for 2010.

All Windows Phone devices include capacitive multi-touch screens, FM radios, Wi-Fi, and certain other features included on the Zune HD. The user interface of the Zune devices, particularly the Zune HD, served as the inspiration for the user interface of Windows Phone. Microsoft refers to the design language of this user interface as Metro and continued to use it across their major products moving forward, such as with Microsoft Band and Band 2, Kin, Windows Phone 7, Windows 8, and Xbox One, until it was eventually succeeded by the Fluent Design System.

On October 11, 2010, Microsoft released Zune software v4.7, which supports syncing of Windows Phone 7 devices with a Windows PC. Zune software was then succeeded as a desktop sync app by the Windows Phone App for Windows Phone 8.

== Comparison of Zune devices ==
The first Zune model, the Zune 30, was released in the USA on November 14, 2006, featuring a capacity of 30 gigabytes, FM radio, and a 3-inch screen. The Zune 30 was initially available in black, brown and white. Retail packages contained a pair of basic earbuds, a USB sync cable, a small drawstring pouch, a start-up CD, documentation and a 14-day free trial of the premium Zune Pass streaming service.

The Zune 80 was announced on October 2, 2007, along with the smaller Zune 4 and Zune 8 to compete with Apple's iPod nano line. These were to be known as the second generation of Zune devices. The Zune 80 featured a 3.2-inch screen, while the Zune 4 and 8 come with a 1.8-inch screen. Both come with a new touchpad-style input device ("squircle") and new software. Additional file support for H.264 and MPEG-4 formats was also included, whereas the older Zune 30 requires these formats to be transcoded to WMV prior to sync. The ability to sync wirelessly (automatically if connected to a power supply), podcast support, and an upgraded song-sharing licensing became available on all models. The new software also allowed a Zune device to communicate with other Zune devices to share pictures and songs. A free firmware update added the new software features to the original Zune 30, and was released on November 13, 2007. The Zune 80 came bundled with a USB connection cord and premium headphones. The Zune 4 and 8 come with a USB connection cord and basic headphones.

The Zune 30, the original Zune music player, has a 30 GB hard drive, 3-inch screen, and a simple directional pad for menu navigation. The second generation of Zune devices includes the Zune 4, 8, 16, 80 and 120. The Zune 4, 8, and 16 are smaller in size and have 4 GB, 8 GB, and 16 GB of flash memory respectively. All second generation Zunes have a Zune Pad instead of the original directional pad that was included on the Zune 30. Microsoft released an upgrade to the software/firmware for all Zune models, including the Zune 30.

On May 26, 2009, Microsoft announced the Zune HD, the first Zune with touch screen. The Zune HD has HD Radio and the ability to display video in high definition through a docking station (sold separately). The screen is multi-touch enabled and uses gestures such as swiping and pinching throughout the player. The device comes with 16 GB, 32 GB, or 64 GB of flash memory. The screen is OLED, 3.3 inches, and has a 480×272 16:9 resolution. Also included are Wi-Fi, a custom Internet Explorer browser, and an accelerometer.

=== Preloaded content ===
Zune devices featured preloaded audio and video content from various artists, including Wisin & Yandel, BT, The Thermals, Paul Oakenfold, and CSS. Limited edition, promotional, and employee-gift Zune devices also featured unique content of varying kinds (i.e. pictures, videos, music, and/or audio/video podcasts).

=== Specifications ===
Zune Model	Zune 30	Zune 4	Zune 8	Zune 16	Zune 80	Zune 120	Zune HD 16	Zune HD 32	Zune HD 64
Released	November 14, 2006	November 13, 2007		September 16, 2008	November 13, 2007	September 16, 2008	September 15, 2009		April 9, 2010
Size	6.1 cm × 11.2 cm × 1.5 cm	4.1 cm × 9.1 cm × 0.8 cm			6.1 cm × 10.8 cm × 1.3 cm		5.27 cm × 10.21 cm × 0.89 cm		
Codename (From "Name that Zune")	Keel	Scorpius			Draco		Pavo		
Weight	158.8 g	47 g			127.6 g		73.7 g		
Screen	7.6 cm (3") (240×320 pixels)	4.6 cm (1.8") (240×320 pixels)			8.1 cm (3.2") (240×320 pixels)		8.4 cm (3.3") (480×272 pixels)		
Storage	30 GB HDD (Upgradable up to 128 GB with either an HDD or SSD)	4 GB Flash	8 GB Flash	16 GB Flash	80 GB HDD (Upgradable up to 128 GB with either an HDD or SSD)	120 GB HDD (Upgradable up to 128 GB with either an HDD or SSD)	16 GB Flash	32 GB Flash	64 GB Flash
Wi-Fi	Zune-to-Zune, sync with computer / wireless network / wireless multiplayer gaming / wireless shopping from Zune devices as of September 16, 2008 (with firmware update)	Zune-to-Zune, sync with computer / wireless network / wireless multiplayer gaming / wireless shopping from Zune devices as of September 16, 2008					Sync with computer / wireless network / wireless multiplayer gaming / Access to a Wi-Fi Zune Marketplace / Web browsing		
Colors	Black, brown, white, pink, red, magenta, orange	Black, green, red, pink, blue (4 GB blue via all means, 8 GB blue in retail only, 16 GB blue via Zune Originals only) (16 GB black is glossy finish only & 4/8GB black is mate finish only)			Black, red (Red previously available only as a Valentine's Day promotion, but later as via Zune Originals)	Black, red, blue (Blue available via Zune Originals only)	Black, platinum, red, blue, green, purple, and magenta. (Platinum 32 GB, black 16 GB, and all sizes of red/blue/green/purple/magenta available via Zune Originals only.)		
Official Model Numbers	Black (1089) White (1090) Brown (1091) Pink (1092) Red (1093) Magenta (?) Orange (?)	1124	1125	1143	1126	1376	1395	1402	1449
Limited Editions	Magenta, Orange Halo 3 Brown Halo 3 Black Red Pink Pink Nylon with Diamonds Wisin & Yandel		Gold GOODS 8 GB, and Black Allen Iverson 8 GB		Gold (GOODS) Black (Joy Division)	Black (Gears of War 2)			
Other Designs _{There are other designs in existence, too, but these are all either promotional and not "Limited Edition," Zune Originals designs, or employee gifts.}	Only 100 magenta and 100 orange were ever released to the public while 100 more of each were given to Zune Team members. 500 of the black Adult Swim Zune were only given to attendees of a special Adult Swim event.	Green DNCC 4 GB and red RNC 4 GB were only given to attendees of their respective conventions.		Yellow citron 16 GB was given only to Microsoft employees as gifts a year prior to the 16 GB model officially releasing to the public.					
Navigation	Circular Directional Pad	Zune Pad					Multi-Touch Screen		
Price (US$ at launch)	$249.95	$149.99	$199.99	$179.00	$249.99	$249.99	$219.99	$289.99	$349.99
Battery life (constant audio / constant video)	12 hours audio, 3.5 hours video	24 hours audio, 4 hours video			24 hours audio, 4 hours video	30 hours audio (Wireless), 4 hours video	33 hours audio, 8.5 hours video		

=== Accessories ===
The standard Zune devices come with basic headphones and a proprietary USB data cable. The Zune 30 comes with these items as well as a carrying bag, and the Zune 80 model has upgraded "Zune Premium" headphones. Accessories that were sold separately included, but are not limited to:

- Charging devices (car adapter, AC wall-socket adapters, external battery)
- I/O adapters (A/V composite, FM transmitters, headphones, USB data cable)
- Docks (charging, multimedia large speaker, vertical hands-free assist)
- Protection (glass screen protection, hardened/cushioning material case protection)
- Carrying cases (standard issue, armband type, and belt clip)
- Replacement parts and upgrades (battery, hard drive, LCD, etc.)

Among the firms that made Zune accessories were Microsoft, Altec Lansing, Belkin, Digital Lifestyle Outfitters (DLO), Dual Electronics, Griffin Technology, Harman Kardon, JBL, Integrated Mobile Electronics, Jamo International, Klipsch Audio Technologies, Logitech, Monster Cable Products Inc., Speck, Targus, Kicker and VAF Research.

=== Firmware ===
According to Microsoft, the most up-to-date firmware version is 4.5 (114) for the Zune HD, which replaces the original player firmware that ships on the device, 4.0 (356). In the case of the Zune 4, 8, 16, 30, 80, and 120 players, the most current player software version is 3.3, which provides compatibility with Zune 4.2. Version 3.3 was primarily a bug fix release and was released on January 26, 2010.

The operating system for the Zune devices is based on the Windows CE kernel for ARM architecture and uses a distribution similar to the Portable Media Center found on the Gigabeat S. Zune's native file compatible formats are:

- JPEG for images;
- WMV (Used by Zune Marketplace)
- MPEG-4 – supported on all models except the Zune 30 device
- H.264 – supported on all models except the Zune 30 device
- Avi video (Xvid) support is included on the Zune HD (firmware versions 4.5 and later).
- MP3 (used by Zune Marketplace)
- AAC (unprotected) not AAC (.m4a)
- WMA Pro (2-channel)
- WMA Standard (used by Zune Marketplace)
- WMA lossless

The graphical user interface (GUI) (called the "twist interface" by Microsoft) has sections for music, videos, pictures, social, radio, podcasts, marketplace, games and settings. It is said to provide "two-dimensional navigation" for scrolling through items with its directional pad. In the music section, users can add songs to a quick playlist without reconnecting to the desktop software. In the picture section, the background can be customized using any image stored on the device (for viewing) as wallpaper. In the radio section, users can receive and play FM radio internally, with North American, Japanese, and European tuning ranges, and display Radio Data System information (usually artist and song) when available. When artist/song information are available, the device can search for the song in the Zune Marketplace for download or purchase. In the social section, users can broadcast the user's profile and recent activity to others nearby.

The first updates to the firmware added sharing features (send, community, list nearby Zune users) as described in FCC filings. Firmware 1.1 allowed the device to inherit sharing capabilities described by codename Pyxis. Early firmware releases patched software bugs. About a year later, the much anticipated 2.2 firmware release added support for DVR-MS (Media Center Recorded TV) files, lossless playback, added wireless syncing, and GUI interface improvements.

Zune supports the Windows Media DRM digital rights management system, which is not compatible with other DRM systems and is not part of the PlaysForSure platform or program. Multimedia content is transferred through Media Transfer Protocol (MTP); however, its proprietary MTP extensions ("MTPZ") place an interoperability barrier between the Zune and previous MTP-based software.

== Zune software ==
The Zune software functions as management software for the device, a full media player application with a library, an interface to the Zune Marketplace, and as a media streaming server. Zune Software is used to sync with all devices with Zune functionality, including the Zune devices, Windows Phone 7, and Microsoft Kin. Zune devices work exclusively with the Zune software and Marketplace.

The Zune software organizes the media in its library and allows users to add to the library by ripping from CDs, syncing with a Zune device, and downloading from the Zune Marketplace. The Zune software also allows one to organize song metadata. It can automatically download album art and metadata tag data for content in the library.

Any file in one's Collection that has a non-Zune compatible format is automatically transcoded into a compatible format upon syncing the files to a Zune compatible device. This feature still works as of the release of Windows 11, however, in Windows 10 and 11 the ability to convert videos, specifically, is broken.

On the PC, the Zune software streams files to other PCs, the Xbox 360, and other compatible devices. The Zune software also connects with the Zune social and keeps track of files swapped with other users.

The Zune software runs only on 32-bit Windows XP or 32-bit/64-bit, Windows Vista, Windows 7, and Windows 8. Windows XP Professional x64 Edition is not supported.

Zune Software was succeeded by the Windows Phone App as a desktop sync service for Windows Phone 8. Windows Phone 7, Kin, and all previous Zune devices will still use the Zune software, which is still available for download on the Windows Phone website.

== Zune Marketplace ==
=== Zune Marketplace successor services ===
As of October 16, 2012, all Zune Marketplace products and services have been replaced by Xbox Music, Xbox Music Pass, Xbox Video, and Windows Phone Store.

Zune software for Windows PCs showing the Zune Marketplace

The Zune Marketplace was an online store that offered music, podcasts, TV shows, movies, music videos, movie trailers and mobile applications. Content can be viewed or purchased on Windows PCs with the Zune software installed, Zune devices, the Xbox 360, the Microsoft Kin phones, or Windows Phone phones.

It offered a selection of 14 million songs and the Zune Pass music subscription service.

==== Availability ====
Zune Marketplace was originally only available in the United States. In October 2010, certain Zune Marketplace content became available in additional countries: the United Kingdom, France, Italy, Spain, Germany, Austria, Belgium, Ireland, the Netherlands, Switzerland, Mexico, Canada, Australia, and New Zealand. However, not all content was available in all countries; for example, podcasts and TV shows were not offered at all outside the United States.

== Sales and marketing ==
=== Marketing ===
Microsoft launched several campaigns to jump-start the Zune. It had a major campaign to promote Zune with "Music the way it wants to be" as a major theme and "Welcome to the social" as an advertisement tagline. Also, the company enlisted about 200 "Zune-masters" to advertise the device on American college campuses, to promote the item, and to run Zune-related events. In exchange, they received free merchandise, including a Zune.

Additionally, Microsoft launched an attempt at viral marketing with its comingzune site, complete with several videos in succession. Along with ZuneInsider, and several other ad hoc events, Microsoft hoped to generate buzz for the product outside of the normal marketing avenues, and market its product as a part of a social construct.

The choice of branding and distribution were part of the Zune as a decision of "two strategies in the market right now: cross-brand ecosystems... and singular brand ecosystems... The former is gaining in share and units sold, but the latter has enormous share and won't give that up easily."

Microsoft normally follows a platform (cross-brand) strategy, as exemplified by the PlaysForSure system. However, its Xbox division has gained some experience with the vertically integrated strategy in which it controls everything end-to-end from the hardware to the online store. With Apple dominating the audio market with its vertically integrated iPod system, the Xbox division won permission to try the same approach, separately from PlaysForSure and PlayReady.

Microsoft also wanted to go beyond Apple's efforts and promote the tagline "the social" and wireless sharing as key differentiators. Chris Stephenson, leader of Zune's marketing and manager of Global Marketing for the Entertainment Business, said, "we see a great opportunity to bring together technology and community to allow consumers to explore and discover music together." New York Times Magazine columnist Rob Walker agrees that the Zune's "community and togetherness seem like a reasonable counterpunch to iPod's supposed attraction as an individuality enabler that allows owners to wallow in their own tasteful personal soundtracks." But he also sees the Zune as having gained appeal as an individualistic statement against the omnipresent iPod: "The most salient feature of the Zune seems to be that it's not an iPod".

MySpace has added the feature to label music players on personal profiles to Zune-themed or a red Zune 8.

=== Sales ===
During its launch week, the original Zune, now Zune 30, was the second-most-sold portable media device with a 9% unit share in the United States: behind the market-leading iPod's 63%. For the first 6 months after launch, NPD Group figures show that the Zune 30 achieved approximately 10% market share in the Hard Drive-based MP3 market and 3% in the overall MP3 player market. As early as December 2006, it was reported that the Zune was struggling not just against the iPod but also other competitors, the Creative Zen and SanDisk Sansa.

According to Bloomberg Television 1.2 million Zune 30 players were sold between November 2006 and June 2007, surpassing a milestone.

On May 6, 2008, Microsoft announced that it had sold just over 2 million Zunes. Roughly one million of those were sold since the second generation Zunes launched in November 2007.

On May 22, 2008, it was reported that GameStop "has decided to stop selling Microsoft's Zune players at its stores due to what it sees as insufficient demand from customers." A statement issued by Adam Sohn, Zune marketing manager said "We have a set of great partnerships...Best Buy, Target, Wal-Mart, and others."

In January 2009, Microsoft's quarterly earnings filing with the SEC indicated that Zune sales had fallen $100 million from 2007 to 2008 during the fourth quarter of the calendar year. The Wall Street Journal estimated that sales appear to have dropped from about $185 million during the holiday period in 2007 to just $85 million in 2008. This may be due to the company's decision not to substantially update the Zune hardware in the fall of 2008.

Zune market share decreased to 2% in the first half of 2009, according to the NPD Group. From January to September 2009 in the U.S., Microsoft only held 2% sales share, compared to Apple's 73%, SanDisk's 9%, and 3% for Sony's Walkman line.

=== Availability outside the U.S. ===
Microsoft released the Zune to Canadian consumers on June 13, 2008, marking the first time it was available outside the U.S. Microsoft has even made efforts to ban visitors outside the United States from Zune Originals. Users wishing to sign up for a Zune Tag could easily circumvent most problems by signing up for a US-based account.

The Zune 2.0–3.* firmware does not support non-romanized fonts other than Cyrillic. East Asian characters used in Chinese and Japanese, for example, show up on the Zune device as mojibake instead of characters. Users have improvised ways to downgrade the firmware on the Zune device to older version that support Asian characters (V1 Zunes can be hacked to display Asian font). This is, however, not recommended by anyone.

=== Discontinuation of Zune software and services ===
In June 2012, Microsoft announced plans to discontinue all "Zune" products, and instead, Microsoft would distribute its digital media content and services under the Xbox Music and Xbox Video names, available on their line of products, including Windows 8 PCs and tablets, Xbox 360 game console, and Windows Phone smart phones. The www.zune.net domain now redirects to Xbox's website, but the software retained the Zune name. The Windows Phone App succeeded Zune Software as the desktop sync service for Windows Phone 8, as part of Microsoft's discontinuation of the Zune brand. However, Zune Software must still be used for Windows Phone 7 desktop sync, and is still available to download from the Windows Phone website for all Windows Phone 7 devices. In November 2015, Microsoft retired the Zune music download and streaming service. Remaining Zune subscribers were switched over to Microsoft's Groove Music platform, whose subscription services closed on December 31, 2017.

== Legacy ==
In 2012, Slate ran a reader poll inviting them to select a piece of defunct technology worthy of a reappraisal, where the Zune beat out Myspace, the PalmPilot, feature phones ("dumbphones") and older versions of Internet Explorer. Farhad Manjoo, the site's technology columnist, went to considerable lengths to acquire a Zune HD. "[It] wasn't as complete a failure as you may believe," he wrote. "If you purchased one over the iPod Touch back in 2009, you wouldn't have regretted it."

Had Microsoft brought the first Zune to market at the same time as the iPod, or even the Zune HD at the time of the iPod Touch, it might have been a serious competitor to those players. Manjoo wrote: "By that point, iPod had become the world's de facto digital entertainment device," he recalled. "To beat it, Microsoft needed to offer something that would make Apple's device look pitifully old-fashioned. The Zune HD didn't do that. Its design marked it as being different from an iPod, but that was pretty much the only difference. There was no reason to buy the Zune unless you wanted to stand apart from the Apple cult. And there was a cost to standing apart from Apple: Because of its popularity, there were millions of apps and accessories for the iPod. As good as it was, the Zune HD couldn't match Apple’s sheer market power." Nevertheless, it was an effective enough product that Manjoo had started using it as his backup music player ("when my iPhone's battery dies").

Like the Edsel, to which it has sometimes been likened, Manjoo said the Zune's failure may have led the way to eventual success with other products. The HD's user interface, he noted, was the first such Microsoft product to rely on text rather than icons, and it would form the basis for Windows Phone, Windows 8, Xbox and all of the company's web-based services. The Segoe typeface that is now used in all of them, as well as Microsoft's current logo, was first used on the Zune.

Business consultant Simon Sinek discusses the Zune in his 2019 book The Infinite Game, describing the Zune as a triumph of design but a failure of long-term strategic thinking. Microsoft was focused on beating Apple's portable music player, while Apple was behind the scenes focused on the iPhone that was introduced a year after the Zune's debut and, to a large extent, rendered obsolete handheld MP3 players by popularizing smartphones.
