= Zune 80, 120 =

2007 Microsoft portable media players

Zune 80/12

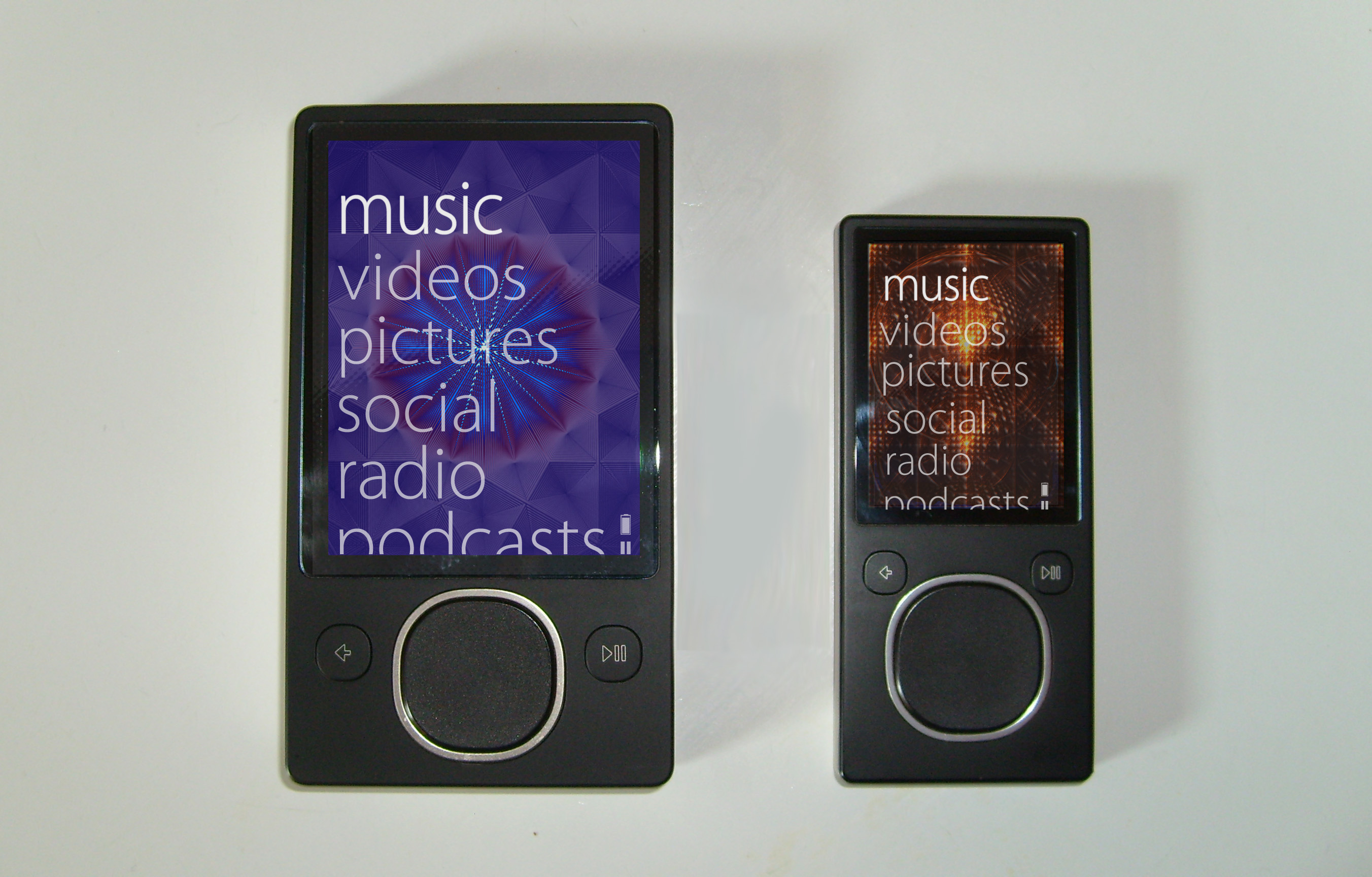
- From left; Zune 80/120 and Zune 4/8/16 menu system
- Manufacturer: Microsoft
- Type: Portable media player
- Released: November 13, 2007
- Operating system: Microsoft Windows CE
- Storage: 80 GB, 120 GB hard disk
- Display: 320 x 240 resolution, 3.2 in. diagonal, scratch resistant glass
- Input: Zune Pad
- Touchpad: Squircle-shaped Zune Pad
- Connectivity: Wi-Fi, USB
- Power: 3.7 V 850 mAh; Internal rechargeable non-removable lithium-ion polymer battery
- Current firmware: 3.30
- Online services: Zune Marketplace
- Dimensions: 4.26 x 2.41 x 0.51 in. (108.2 x 61.1 x 12.9 mm)
- Weight: 4.5 oz.
- Predecessor: Zune 30
- Successor: Zune HD
- Related: Zune 4, 8, 16

The Zune 80 and Zune 120 are portable media players developed by Microsoft in its Zune series of media players. The Zune 80 was announced on October 2, 2007 and was released on November 13, 2007. It, along with the Zune 4, 8, and 16, is part of the second generation of Zune devices. It features music, video, and podcast support, and comes with Wi-Fi and FM Radio. The Zune 120, part of the second generation of Zune devices, was released September 16, 2008. As of January 2010, the devices run the 3.3 firmware.

== Overview ==
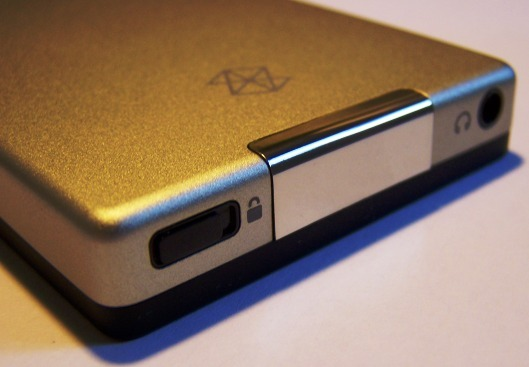
Zune 80

Aiming to improve on the design of the original Zune, the Zune 80/120 is 3.6 millimeters thinner and 31 grams lighter. It also has a slightly larger screen (3.2 inches instead of 3) and higher battery life (up to 24 hours for music, versus up to 14). Although similar internally, battery life improvements were possible due to a reduction in the refresh rate (30 Hz down from 60 Hz) and CPU clock speed (499 MHz down from 524 MHz). The D-pad of the original has been replaced by the patented Zune Pad, which supplements 5-way clicking using a capacitive touchpad similar to the iPod Click Wheel and only responding to human touch. The Zune 80 shipped with a newer firmware version than the original Zune, but a firmware update for the original restored parity. The Wi-Fi antenna could be used for buying music on the device, playing with others in games via Wi-Fi, wireless synchronization and to share photos, podcasts, and music with other Zunes, although shared songs may only be played three times on the receiving Zune.

== Reception ==
The Zune 80 has been reviewed more positively than its predecessor and on par with the iPod classic, its primary competitor during the period. CNET's review said, "The Zune has blossomed from an ugly duckling into a worthy iPod alternative." Wired's head-to-head review said the Zune 80 edged out the iPod classic due to its screen, Wi-Fi, radio, and navigation. However, some reviews have also been critical of the Zune Marketplace, which lacked movies (though it later began carrying TV shows and movies), and the lack of Mac support.

== Availability ==
Most stores did not stock the player during its launch as they were delayed for 6 weeks. However, there were limited numbers of Zune 80s in some stores like Circuit City and Wal-Mart, and most were sold out as soon as they were available. As of June 13, 2008 the Zune was available in Canada at most major retailers including The Source, Best Buy, and Future Shop. The Zune has since been discontinued at these retailers from mid-late 2009 as they were being phased out due to Marketplace issues.

The 80 was available in black and red, and the 120 was available in black and red, with matte black on the back and glossy black on the front, and glossy red front available from the Zune Store.

== Durability ==
The Zune 80 and 120 have scratch-resistant glass displays, and the back can withstand fine scratches if dropped on the floor. The premium in-ear earphones (available only with the Zune 80 unless purchased separately) are highly durable and have a magnetic back so they can stay together instead of coiling around each other to prevent damage to the wire.

== Modification ==
As with many hard disk based media players Zune owners have a few options regarding upgrades. Using a pry tool will allow the user to access the hard disk and battery for replacement/repair. Note that the battery is soldered with 4 wires and incorrect wiring will likely harm the device. Due to Windows CE limitations the maximum drive size seems to be 120 GB (including 128 GB based solid state drives). Note that compatibility is limited to 1.8" PATA drives and uses a specific ZIF interface. The ZIF connector is plug and play but users will have to host their own firmware update server to allow the Zune software to load firmware onto the new drive due to Microsoft's discontinuation of all Zune services.

== See also ==
- Comparison of online music stores
- Online music stores
