= Zune 30 =

Portable media player developed by Microsoft

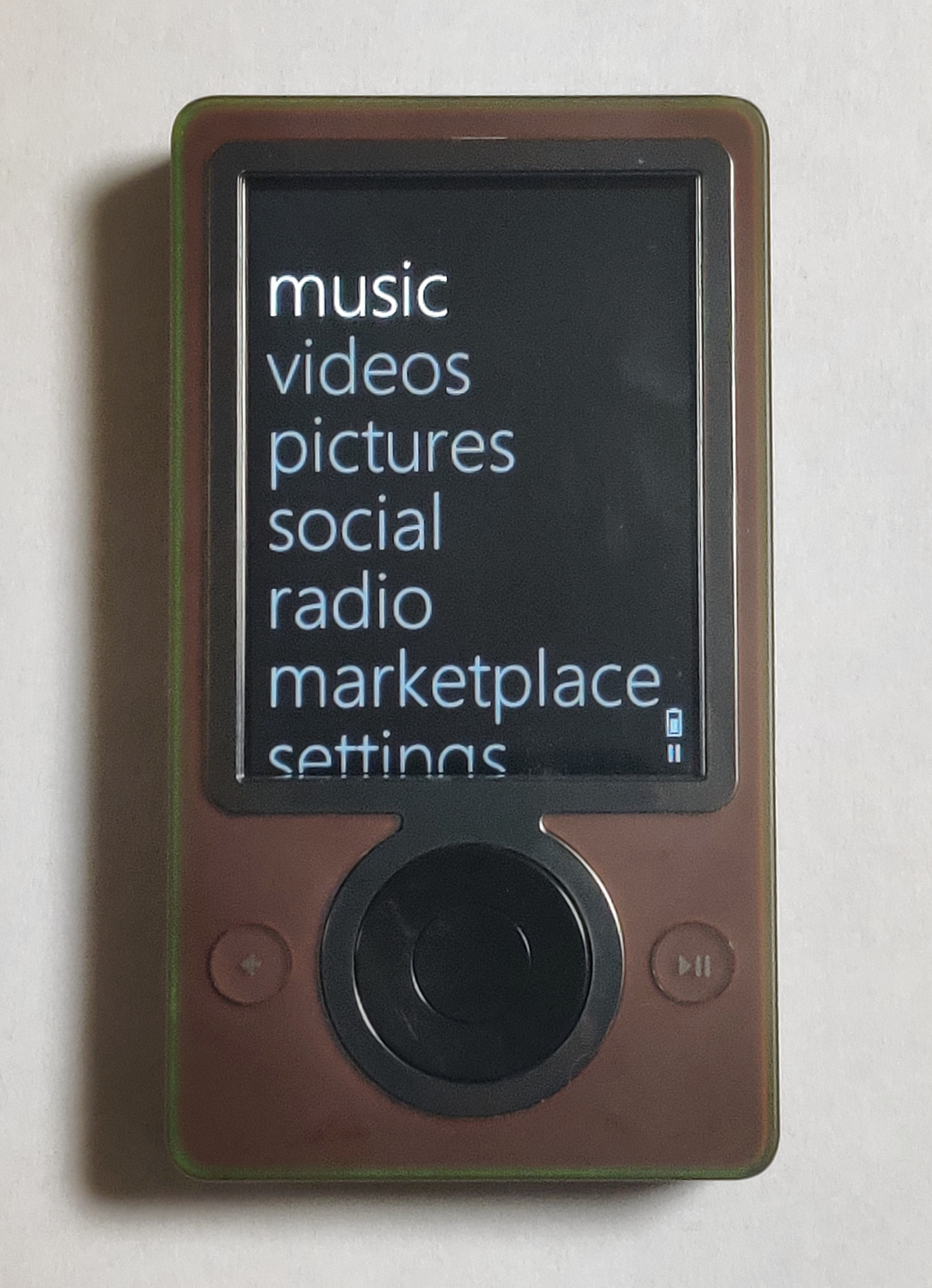
- Manufacturer: Microsoft
- Type: Portable media player
- Released: November 14, 2006
- Operating system: Windows Embedded CE 6.0
- Storage: 30 GB Hard disk
- Display: 320 x 240 resolution, 3 in. diagonal
- Input: Circular directional pad
- Connectivity: Wi-Fi, USB
- Power: 3.7V Lithium-Ion Internal Battery
- Current firmware: 3.30
- Online services: Zune Marketplace
- Dimensions: 2.4 × 4.4 × 0.58 inches
- Weight: 5.6 ounces
- Successor: Zune 80
- Related: Zune 4, 8, 16

The Zune 30 is a portable media player developed by Microsoft, and the first hardware device in Microsoft's Zune brand. It was released on November 14, 2006, simply named the Zune. After subsequent versions with different hard drive capacities, the original Zune was renamed Zune 30.

The consumer edition was initially offered in black, brown, and pearl white, which came with a "doubleshot," or translucent glow, in a different color, of blue, green, and clear, respectively. First-party cases were made from leather and fabric while third-party cases were usually made from a silicone rubber. Controls included a circular controller with four buttons for direction, as well as a middle button to select a song album or menu, a back button to the left, a play/pause button to the right, and a hold switch atop the player next to the headphone port. The words "Hello from Seattle" were inscribed on the back of the outer shell, and it featured several songs, videos, and images pre-loaded on the device. The Zune originally sold at a retail price of $249.99 with the cost being reduced to $199.99 on September 5, 2007.

The limited editions came in different colors and artwork and were offered in three consecutive months. 100 of each two special colors, Magenta and orange, were distributed randomly at launch and came with a numbered certificate of authenticity. 100 of each color were also given to the Zune team as gifts. They had "Welcome to the Social November 14, 2006" written on the back and came in white packaging featuring Zune artwork, then were released on the very same month. Cesar Menendez from the Microsoft Zune team confirmed the coming of a Pink Zune around mid-May for a limited run of 100,000 units. The aforementioned magenta color was commonly called "pink" at the time of its limited release, but with the release of an official pink option it became clear that the 200 limited release units were magenta and orange to represent that colors of the Zune logo. Red Zunes were also sold in a limited quantity of 100,000, but were exclusive to Target stores and the Amazon website. "Ambassador" artwork Zunes were given to Microsoft's "Zune Master" college-student marketers on December 15, 2006.

A Halo 3 inspired Zune developed in partnership with the game's creators Bungie was announced at a Halo 3 event in May 2007. The Halo 3 Zune came in either dark brown or black, and featured a Halo symbol on the back. Both versions were loaded with Halo content, including a custom episode of the popular series Red vs. Blue and were designed to feel like something that came from the game. The black Halo 3 Zune was sold exclusively through GameStop beginning on June 27, 2007, while the dark brown Halo 3 Zunes was carried in the AAFES "PX" for the military. In early August 2007, 300 of the dark brown Halo 3 Zunes were distributed free of charge by the USO to soldiers deployed to foreign soil. On June 10, 2007, a special edition red Zune became available on Amazon.com and also at Target stores within the United States.

Released on October 29, 2007, a Wisin & Yandel custom Zune was available exclusively at Wal-Mart stores. This custom Zune was created for fans of the Latin music group Wisin & Yandel and was pre-loaded with the album Wisin vs. Yandel Los Extraterrestres. Live concert footage, videos, images and other music were also included. The Wisin & Yandel Zune came in black with a custom graphic on the back.

== Freescale Driver Issue ==
At approximately midnight Pacific Standard Time, on December 31, 2008, Zune 30s froze. The problem was caused by a third-party driver written by Freescale for their MC13783 PMIC processor. The bug also froze up Toshiba Gigabeat S media players that shared the same Freescale device and driver. The exact cause was first discovered by itsnotabigtruck of Zune Boards. What itsnotabigtruck found out was that there was an if statement inside a while loop that was written in such a way that on that particular day, because it was a leap year and the day count was 366, the loop was destined to continuously self-execute until the 24 hours of that day were up. People who experienced the problem gave the event many names, among them Z2K9, Y2K9, Z2K, the Zune Screen of Death, Zunepocalypse, and the December 31, 2008, Zune Meltdown.

Microsoft posted a comment on the support front page stating the issue is because 2008 is a leap year, and a firmware clock driver used by the Zune 30 improperly handled the last day of a leap year, causing the player to freeze. The driver was for a part used only in the Zune 30 model, which was why the bug didn't affect other Zune models. The official fix was to drain the device battery and then recharge after midday GMT on January 1, 2009.

== Hardware ==
- Volume: 4.4 × 2.4 × 0.58 inches (11.18 × 6.10 × 1.47 cm)
- Weight: 5.6 ounces (158.8 g)
- Screen: 3 inches (7.6 cm) diagonal, 2.4 inches (6.1 cm) × 1.8 inches (4.6 cm) QVGA LCD, 320×240 pixels, 133.33 PPI, 65k colors (16-bit color)
- Hard disk: 30 GB hard disk, form factor short FF 1.8 inches
- Wi-Fi: Zune-to-Zune song transfer, Zune-to-Zune game connect, Zune-to-PC music library synchronizing, Zune Marketplace Downloads when configured with a Zunetag and Marketplace Account (Firmware 3.0 dependent); 802.11b/g (BB|RF); i, e (MAC)
- TV out: NTSC, PAL, ACP (Macrovision 7)
- USB: USB 1.1, 2.0
- Radio: 76-108 MHz FM, RDS, RBDS
- Battery: Rechargeable lithium-ion, 3.7 V, 800 mAh
1. Discharge: 13–14 hours music (on-off Wi-Fi), 4 hours video
2. Charge: 2–3 hours (90%-full)
- CPU and display controller: Freescale i. MX31L processor with ARM architecture, VFP, IPU
- RAM: 64 MB (64 × 2^{20} bytes) 133 MHz Mobile SDR SDRAM, 16 MB available in XNA games, 90 mA
- Flash memory: 2 MB NOR, 1Mx16 boot block, 3.3 V
- Bus switch: Low voltage octal FET bus switch
- ATA driver: 8-bit bus transceiver/driver
- Audio: Wolfson WM8978 24-bit DAC, 48 kHz (max), 0.9 W (Toshiba Gigabeat F series, and the iPod 5G, used the WM8758).
- Audio and power manager: 16-bit DAC, 44.1 kHz
