= SpiralFrog =

Defunct early music streaming service

SpiralFrog, Inc.
- Industry: Music Downloads
- Founded: 2007
- Defunct: 2009
- Headquarters: New York, New York
- Parent: none
- Website: Formerly SpiralFrog.com

SpiralFrog was a very early music streaming service based in New York City that launched in the United States and Canada on September 17, 2007. SpiralFrog offered free and legal music downloads, all supported by advertising, and was the largest site of its kind in North America. On March 19, 2009, SpiralFrog terminated operations due to loan recalls. While SpiralFrog was not successful in the end, it nonetheless helped shaped the digital music industry shift from the purchase to streaming models, and its ultimate revenue recovery.

== Business model ==
SpiralFrog was entirely supported by advertising, allowing free download of its music. The ads were presented in the form of banner ads much like any news website rather than in the form of popups or adware. Songs downloaded from the service could not be burned to a CD, put on more than two portable devices and would not work on Mac OS X or the Apple iPod, iPhone, or the Microsoft Zune. However, they would work with any digital audio player or music phone that supports WMA PlaysForSure subscription services. Customers had to visit the site at least once every 60 days and renew their license by signing in or downloading a song, and the songs would work for sixty days after the last license renewal. In the event that the license should expire, it could always be renewed at a later date to restore function to the tracks. For songs that were on portable devices, the device had to be synced with a computer once every 60 days to keep the songs active. In addition to music, Spiralfrog had 5000+ music videos also available for free at 300 kbit/s streaming or 1000 kbit/s if you chose to download it. Spiralfrog boasted approximately 800,000 songs upon its launch and offered more than 3 million tracks for download. When active Spiralfrog.com had 3,000,000+ songs and 5,000+ music videos available for free download, and at peak had more than 6,000,000 monthly visitors, and 2.6 million registered users.

== Music selection ==
SpiralFrog had licensing agreements with most major music owners in the United States, Canada and in Britain.

- EMI Music Publishing
- BMI
- Universal Music Group
- Canadian Musical Reproduction Rights Agency (CMRRA-SODRAC Inc., CSI) (The licensing agency which represents authors and music publishers and licenses the reproduction of their songs in Canada to online music distribution services.)
- Sony/ATV Music Publishing
- KOCH Records
- Helene Blue
- GoDigital Media Group
- Kudos Records
- Click Record Productions
- IODA
- INgrooves digital distributor
- The Orchard digital distributor

== Launching ==
On September 17, 2007, SpiralFrog.com formally launched in United States. Joe Mohen, then chairman and founder of SpiralFrog Inc. stated: "With SpiralFrog you know what you're getting ... there's no threat of viruses, adware or spyware; We believe it will be a very powerful alternative to the pirate sites." At initial launch, it offered 800,000 tracks and 3,500 music videos for download (by way of Vivendi SA's Universal Music Group).

== File formats ==
SpiralFrog utilized 128 kbit/s which is the standard for most digital music stores such as the Walmart digital music store or 192 kbit/s (for more complex songs that would otherwise sound distorted) Windows Media Audio files wrapped in Microsoft's PlaysForSure DRM. DRM does not allow burning music to a CD but allows sideloading music to up to two portable audio devices. Music from SpiralFrog was not compatible with the Apple iPod or Microsoft's Zune.

== Competition ==
- Qtrax was purported to be a legal peer-to-peer (P2P) music service that planned to offer ad-supported music tracks. A major launch event held at the Cannes Music Festival in January 2008 fell flat when it was discovered that Qtrax had effectively signed no agreements with any of the four major music labels. It later signed with EMI & Universal Music Group for recording rights and EMI, Warner Chappell, Sony/ATV and UMG/BMG for publishing. Qtrax had over 800,000 tracks, however, music can only be played within the Qtrax client and cannot be transferred to a portable device. The service shut down in late 2018.
- imeem was a free advertising-supported streaming music service which followed a user-generated content model. imeem had music from all the major labels in addition to a number of indie labels. It did not, however, enable transfer to a portable music device. The service was acquired by MySpace in 2009 and shut down the same day.
- We7 was a UK-based, ad-supported music service co-founded by Peter Gabriel, a digital music pioneer. It offered streaming of full tracks from mixture of mainstream international artists and indie artists from Sony BMG, V2, Sanctuary Records, Big Fish Media, IRIS, InGrooves, BFM Digital, and some free downloads. Acquired by British retailer Tesco in 2012, it rebranded as Blinkbox Music in 2013. In early 2015 it was again sold, this time to Australian streaming service Guvera before closing down later that same year.
- Ruckus Network was a free ad-supported online music service available to students at all American colleges. With its official launch in September 2004, Ruckus became the first online music service focused exclusively on the college market. Ruckus used Microsoft's Windows Media DRM system, allowing the possibility of loading files onto compatible PlayForSure portable media players. Their service offered over 3 million tracks free to its users. However, in February 2009, Ruckus announced that its services will no longer be available.
- RCRD LBL which was part music website, part social networking website and allowed downloads of songs in DRM-free MP3 format rather than copy-protected songs, some published under a Creative Commons license that allows the individual to legally share it with their friends for non-commercial purposes. The site was closed in 2013.
- Spotify is a proprietary music streaming program, which allows instant listening to specific tracks or albums with almost no buffering delay.

== Demise and Shut Down ==
- On Friday March 20, 2009 at 4:00 PDT, Spiral Frog servers shut down for good. Unnamed sources say that the music provider supposedly tried to borrow at least $9 million last year to stay in business. Its shut down comes on the heels of another ad-supported music provider, Ruckus, which was geared toward college students.
- Spiralfrog announced that the downloaded music it provided will play for sixty days, after which time the license will expire and any music downloaded will no longer work.

== See also ==
- Qtrax
- imeem
- Jamendo
- Spotify
