= Joanne Bradford =

American businesswoman

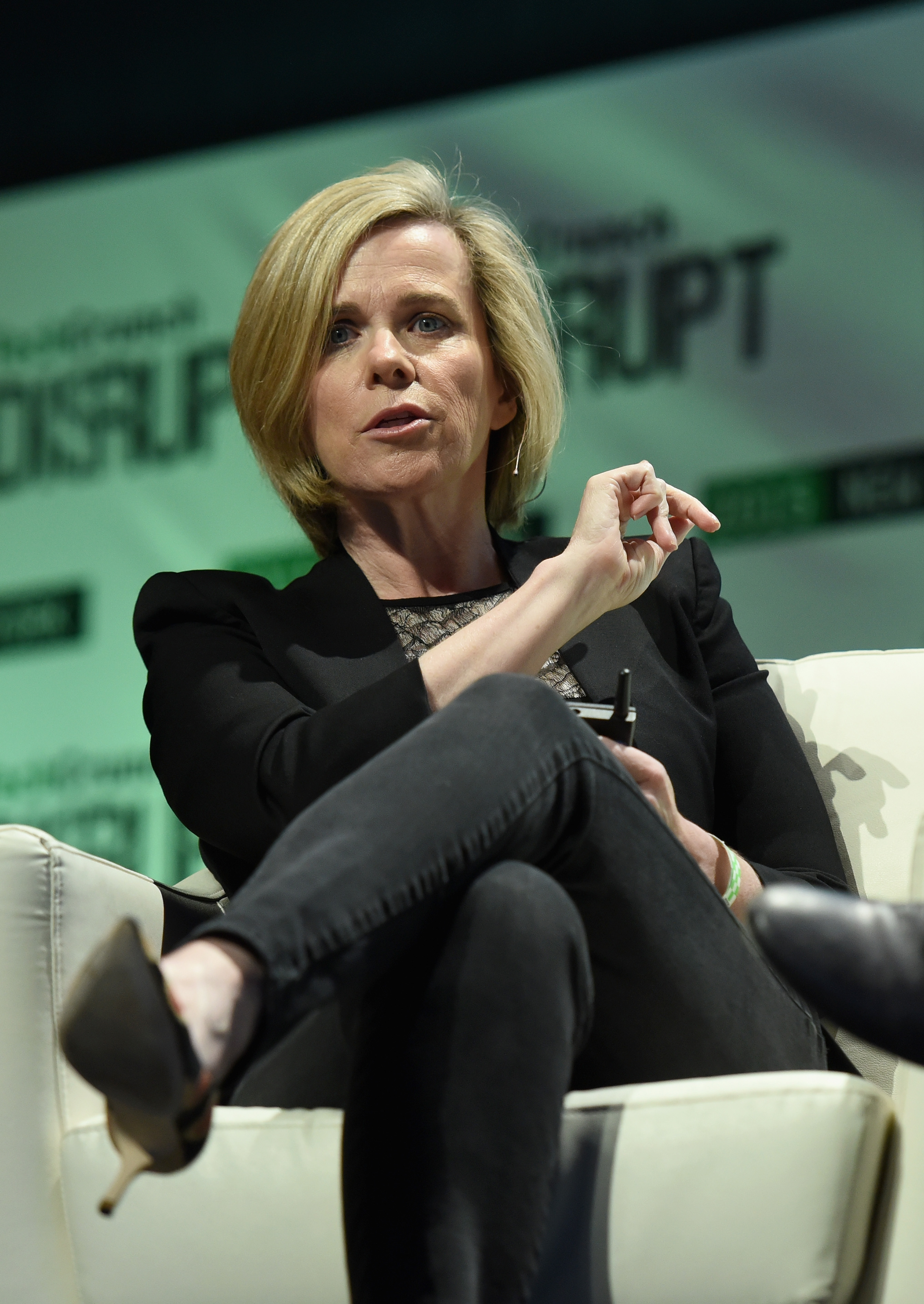
Joanne Bradford speaking at TechCrunch Disrupt NY 2015

Joanne Bradford is an American businesswoman and financial technology executive, who most recently served as the Chief Money Officer at Domain Money, a leading flat-fee financial planning platform that is changing the narrative on how Americans gain access to financial advice .

She has had an extensive career in marketing, monetization and operations at technology and financial companies in Silicon Valley and Los Angeles, California.

== Education ==
Bradford graduated with a BA in Journalism and Advertising at San Diego State University in 1986.

== Career ==
Bradford's early career began at BusinessWeek and then Microsoft, where she led sales and product marketing for MSN and AdCenter.

In March 2008, she left Microsoft to become Executive Vice President of National Marketing Services at the ad agency Spot Runner, a much smaller start up company, where she worked for six months before joining Yahoo! in the fall of 2008 as Senior Vice President of US Revenue and Market Development, heading up sales.

Two years later, she became Chief Revenue Officer at Demand Media, marking her second move from a large company to a much smaller startup. This transition was controversial, as it was announced in the press before she informed her colleagues at Yahoo! that she was leaving.

After a brief tenure as President of the San Francisco Chronicle, Bradford joined Pinterest in 2013, where she led early monetization efforts. She left Pinterest in early 2015 following a management reshuffle, having declined an offer to move to another role as Head of Direct Sales.

Later that year, she joined lender SoFi as Chief Operating Officer. During her time at the company, she was responsible for raising SoFi's profile as a leading fintech brand.

In June 2019, Bradford departed SoFi alongside two other executives, Kevin Moss and Ashish Jain, marking a significant moment for the company shortly after new CEO Anthony Noto joined in 2018.

Following her departure from SoFi, she took up the role of president at Honey, a financial start up centered around automating access to discounts and the best online deals, in August 2019. In 2021, Bradford was named the chief growth officer of MNTN, an advertising technology company.

Bradford has been a member of the executive board of a number of organisations, including Wave, OneLogin, Comscore, and the anti-poverty charity CARE.

== Awards and achievements ==
Bradford was included in the Forbes CMO Next 2018 List, Ad Age's 100 Most Influential Women in Advertising and was a recipient of the Bill Gates Chairman's Award at Microsoft.
