= PassAlong Networks =

PassAlong Networks Tennessee Pacific Group, LLC
- Type: Private
- Industry: Digital music
- Founded: 2002
- Defunct: May 5, 2009; reopened June 28, 2010
- Headquarters: Franklin, TN, United States
- Key people: Dave Jaworski, CEO; Scott Lewis, SVP; Louis Upkins, SVP; Patrick Reilly, SVP; Skip Franklin, SVP; Kevin Gorman, SVP
- Products: Storeblocks, OnTour, FreedomMP3
- Number of employees: 80
- Subsidiaries: Speakerheart
- Website: PassAlong Networks website

PassAlong Networks, also known as Tennessee Pacific Group, LLC, was a developer of digital media innovations and services located in Franklin, Tennessee. The company had a digital music library of three million licensed songs, two million of which were raw MP3 music files, and provided a series of products and services in the digital media marketplace.

The company had digital music catalog agreements with the four major record labels: Warner Music Group, Universal Music Group, EMI, and Sony/BMG. PassAlong’s catalog was composed of non-DRM, MP3 music files. The other major catalogs were DRM-protected files based on Microsoft WMA technology. The Independent MP3 catalog included songs from The Orchard, Nettwerk Music, IODA, CD Baby, Naxos Records, and many others.

== Products ==
The Company Products include:

- StoreBlocks: online retail store-building platforms, media libraries, metadata, and web services. Its technology includes turnkey templates, Web services, reporting systems, storefront showcases, a music referral system, consumer rewards programs, legal music sharing, and a library of raw MP3s to enable consumer interoperability. This platform currently powers over 120 digital stores, including BreakthruRadio, TransWorld’s f.y.e. online music store and Procter & Gamble's Julie's Jukebox, a digital music store on HomeMadeSimple.com. See www.StoreBlocks.com for more information.
- OnTour: consumer-direct media showcases, widgets, data services, and notification systems. Its core product notifies users when their favorite artists are performing a concert in their area. The OnTour Barenaked Ladies Special Edition won the 2006 Billboard Demmxpo Award for Best Use of Technology by an Artist. See www.OnTour.net for more information
- Connected Consumer: interactive CE interfaces and media services for the digital media ecosystem.
- FreedomMP3: protection technologies and media tracking services
- Speakerheart: a subsidiary to empower independent artists to self-publish and promote their works online. See www.Speakerheart.com for more information.

== History of PassAlong Networks ==
Founded in 2002 in Nashville, Tennessee, the company moved their headquarters to the Factory at Franklin, south of Nashville. The founders included former Microsoft executive Dave Jaworski, digital media producer Brad Edmonson, former EMI executive Scott Hughes, Scott Lewis, Robin Pou, and independent music producer Jozef Nuyens, who also owns The Castle Studio in Franklin, Tennessee.

In September 2004, PassAlong launched its first digital music download store in conjunction with eBay. The store became the largest store on eBay. The eBay relationship is longer in place however. Then the company launched over two hundred stores, including Procter & Gamble's Home Made Simple store and the f.y.e.- for your entertainment, digital download store. PassAlong became Microsoft PlaysForSure certified in December 2004. In 2006 the company released a non-DRM solution that helps guard artist content without restricting interoperability on the consumer side. In that year PassAlong joined DDEX to develop metadata standards across the industry. Members include Microsoft and Apple Computer.

The company stopped operations on May 5, 2009. The closing was evidently a result of losing investors who were forced to pull out by the effects of the waning economy. At the time of closing, new initiatives included variable-pricing programs and in-car music downloads, digital video libraries, and social networks.

== DRM and Microsoft PlaysForSure ==
The PassAlong library of digital songs includes both DRM files and MP3 files. The DRM (Digital Rights Management) technology used was developed by Microsoft to protect digital music files. They are called WMA or Windows Media Audio files.

The certification program developed by Microsoft to ensure that portable devices (portable media players, phones, etc.) and content services have been tested against several hundred compatibility and performance requirements, is called Microsoft PlaysForSure. PassAlong is PlaysForSure certified.

== See also ==
Artist-rights, Rightsholder organizations, and royalties:

- RIAA - Recording Industry Association of America
- CRIA - the Canadian Recording Industry Association
- ASCAP - performance rights organization for songwriters, composers, publishers
- BMI - performance rights organization for songwriters, composers, publishers
- SESAC - - performance rights organization for songwriters, composers, publishers
- SOCAN - Canadian performance rights organization
- Harry Fox Agency - agency that collects and distributes mechanical license fees on behalf of music publishers
- CMRRA - Canadian agency for mechanical license fees
- Soundscan - Performance tracking used by Billboard Magazine and others
- RoyaltyShare - an outsourced royalty processing solution for the music industry
- DRM - Digital Rights Management
- DMCA - The Digital Millennium Copyright Act, made law in 1998, and validated DRM

Alternative artist rights/royalty models and open source:

- Creative Commons
- Creative Commons licenses
- Open content
- Open source
- Public domain
- Share-alike

Consumer rights, user experience, and device interoperability:

- Electronic Frontier Foundation
- American Electronics Association - AEA, which runs CES, and many programs
- IEEE - Institute of Electrical and Electronics Engineers focuses on the advancement of technology
- User experience
- Fair use - US copyright law that allows limited use of copyrighted material without permission from rightsholders
- Consumer rights
- Interoperability - connecting people, content, devices, and digital ecosystems
- DMCRA - Digital Media Consumers' Rights Act (proposed law)

News, Blogs and Sources:

- Digital Media Wire

== Notes and references ==
- - June 12, 2007, News.com blog on PassAlong - EMI MP3 catalog arrangement
- EMI Adds DRM-Free MP3s to PassAlong Networks Online Stores- June 13, 2007 by Mark Hefflinger, Digital Media Wire
- EBay links with PassAlong to offer new music service - September 23, 2004 San Francisco Chronicle article by Benny Evangelista, Chronicle Staff Writer
- PassAlong Networks CEO's Tablet PC- Nov 3, 2005 - by Forbes.com writer David M. Ewalt
- PassAlong Networks, MP3Car.com Team on Car Stereo Downloads-May 25, 2007 by Mark Hefflinger, Digital Media Wire
- Five Questions with Dave Jaworski, CEO, Passalong Networks-February 22, 2007 by Jay Baage, Digital Media Wire
