= Mark Rosenthal =

Mark Rosenthal may refer to:

- Mark C. Rosenthal, American business executive
- Mark Rosenthal (filmmaker), American screenwriter and film director
- Mark Moisevich Rosenthal (1906–1975), Soviet philosopher and teacher
- Márk Rosenthal or Rózsavölgyi (1787–1848), Hungarian violinist and composer

== See also ==
- Marc Rosenthal, American singer and songwriter performing as Milton
