= Discontinued Archos products =

French electronics company products

The French consumer electronics company Archos manufactured a number of products which have since been discontinued.

== Handheld and portable computers with x86 compatible processors ==
=== ARCHOS 10 netbook ===
In January 2009, Archos released their first netbook, the Archos 10, following the naming scheme of the IMT players. It is a standard netbook featuring the intel Atom N260 CPU, a 10.2" WSVGA screen, 1GB of RAM, a 160GB Harddrive, and Windows XP. It is a rebranded Hasee MJ125, but includes additional anti-virus, multimedia, and productivity software. It is no longer available on their website.

A variant netbook, the ARCHOS 10s, featured a silver case in place of the ARCHOS 10's black shell.

== Handheld computers with ARM-compatible processors ==
=== Generation 4 ===
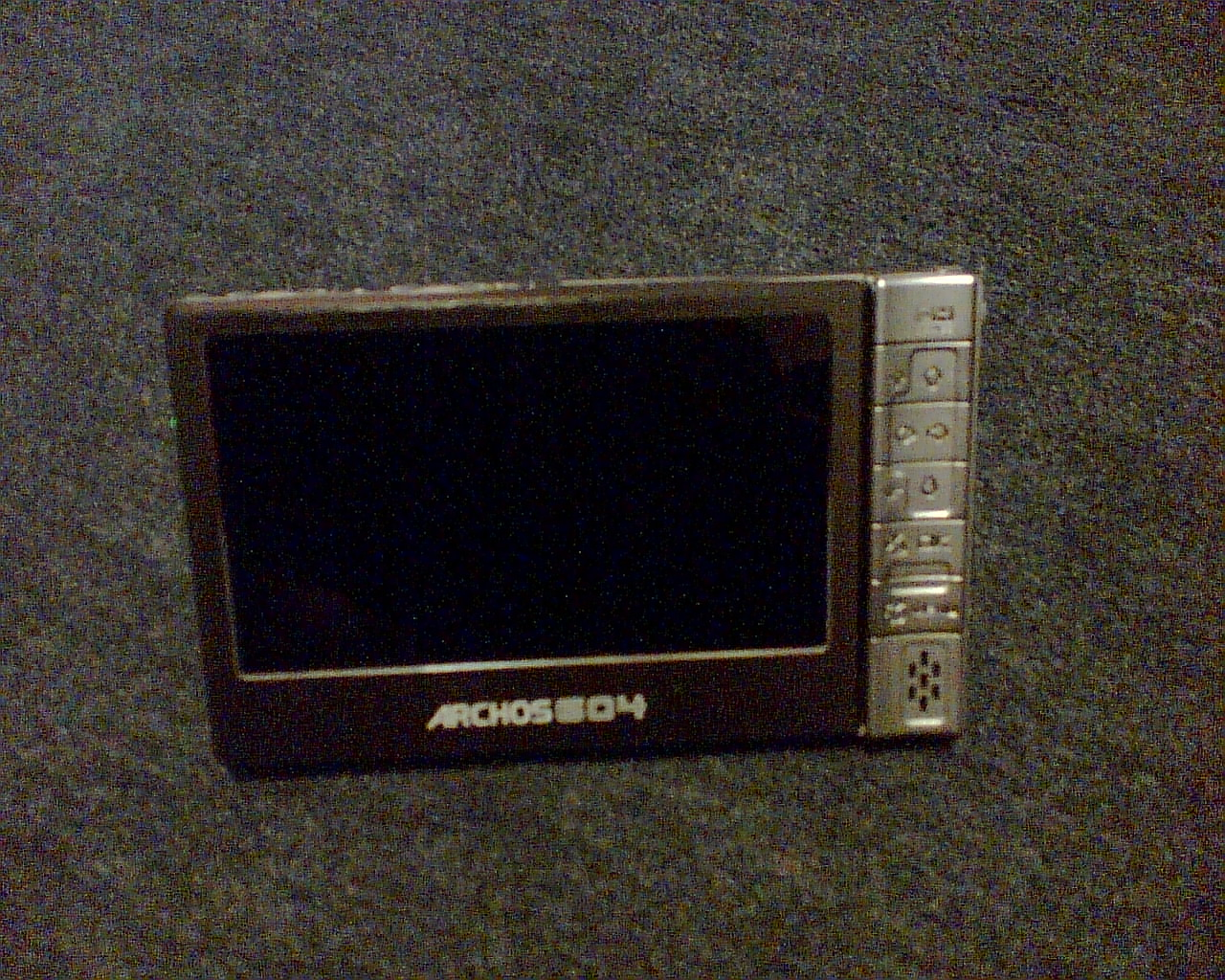
Archos 604

The Generation 4 series is an upgrade to the previous AV Series. The eight models include the 404, the 504, the 604, the 604 WiFi, and the 704 WiFi. All players in this series are Microsoft PlaysForSure compatible.

The Generation 4 players were modular, with the unit base priced cheaply and additional features available at extra cost. The add-on DVR Station and DVR Travel Adapter, sold separately, allowed video recording from sources including satellite, cable, and terrestrial television, as well as DVD players. The players included some working video codecs, but licensing costs meant support for MPEG-2/VOB videos with Dolby 5.1 Sound (AC3) sound and H.264 with AAC sound were not included as standard.

Documentation of the series' processor core and operating system is scant. The 404, 504 and 604 are known to use a TI DaVinci processor of type DM644x, combining an ARM9 and a DSP processor. For the 700 models a TI DM420 (no further details found in public) might serve as the CPU. For the rest of the models no documentation is available, though parts of the firmware loader were licensed under GPL and thus published. A single source claims the OS to be Windows Mobile on all models.

=== Generation 5 ===
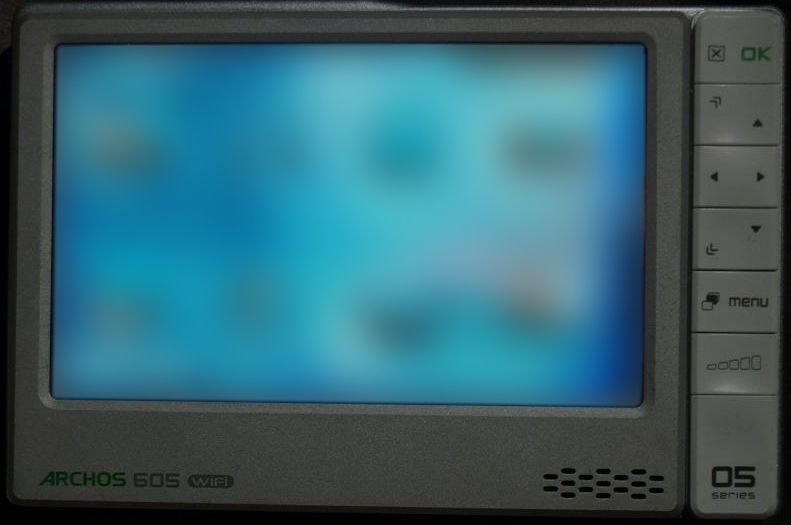
Archos 605 WiFi

On June 14, 2007, Archos released details of the new flagship 605 WiFi, and of new 105, 405, and 705 players.

The 605 Wifi and 405 officially went on sale on September 1, 2007. The 605Wifi comes in 30GB, 80GB, and 160GB models as well as a 4GB model with an added SDHC slot. There is also a DSGi (Electrical Retailer) model specific to the United Kingdom which has a 40GB Hard Drive. The 405 comes in 2GB with SDHC slot. A 30GB version was added later.

The 105 included some video capabilities but was still pitched mainly as a small and affordable MP3 player. The 705 uses a similar design to the 704 with a slimmer profile and new 5th Gen features.

The main upgrade in this series was the addition of the Archos content portals (ACP). The Opera web browser was made optional, and support for Adobe Flash, facilitating online video streaming, was implemented. Firmware 2.1.04 was released on May 27, 2008 which allowed YouTube and Google Video streaming.

==== Archos TV+ ====
The Archos TV+ was a standalone Digital Video Recorder station from Archos. It performed similarly to an Archos player with a DVR dock, and included a Qwerty remote for navigation and internet use.

The device was announced alongside the Generation 5 players. The Archos TV+ was released in January and received initial reviews at the 2008 Consumer Electronics Show.

=== Generation 6 ===
On August 19, 2008, Archos announced their 6th generation portable media players with WiFi and cellular 3G internet capabilities.

Labeled as "Internet Media Tablets" or "IMTs" for short, they shipped with a full-function Presto-based web browser, vTuner-based web TV and radio applications requiring registration. These devices used a built-in hard disk for storage, with capacities of 60, 120, 160, and 250 GB; while the Archos 7 is available in 160 and 320 GB capacities and the Archos 5G is in 30 GB. Though similar to the Archos 5, the Archos 5G features 3.5G HSDPA wireless connectivity.

==== Archos 5 Internet Media Tablet ====
Being an Internet Media Tablet this device utilizes a unique Linux OS.

Specifications

- Processor based on ARM Cortex-A8, 32 bit, dual-issue, superscalar core @ 600 MHz
- 128 MB of RAM
- 4.8" display, 800x480 resolution
- Video Playback
- Music Playback
- Storage: 30gb - sfr 3g 1.8" hdd, 60GB - 250GB with 2.5" hard drive (ext3 file-system for system partition, FAT32 for storage)

==== ARCHOS 7 internet media tablet ====
The Archos 7 was A 7" version of the Archos 5 internet media tablet, running on the same system.

Specifications

- 7" display, 800x480 resolution
- Video Playback
- Music Playback
- Storage: 160 or 320GB with 2.5" hard drive

== Digital Camcorders, audio/video players and PDAs with limited or no Internet connectivity ==
=== AV series ===
The AV300 was released Monday March 22, 2004, and weighs 12.3 ounces (350 g).

The optional AVCam 300 turns the device into a digital camera and camcorder, with other selective addons available such as an FM radio remote control (which also enables radio recording) and a memory card reader. The battery life of the device is stated at 3 and a half hours when watching video or 10 hours when listening to music.

The AV400 runs the same software as AV300, the camera has been removed and a CompactFlash card slot has been built directly into the product. Image preview slides and DRM WMA support, as well as WMV access are also included.

The AV500 came just before the PMA400 was released; there was a name conflict within the models. The PMA400 was scheduled to be released as the AV500. Ultimately, the name went to a new model of Digital Video Recorder (DVR). The Archos AV500 is similar to the GMini 500, but it has extra facilities (video recording and the new AV Pod).

With the release of the AV700, Archos changed the company slogan from "Think Smaller" to "On The Go". In 2006, Archos developed the TV-Edition from the AV700, the AV700TV.

=== PMA400 ===
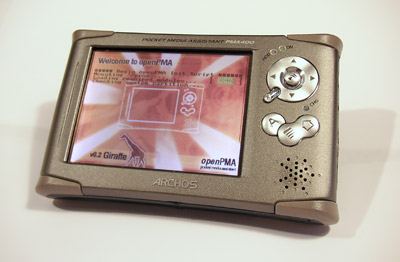
Archos PMA400 booting openPMA 0.2 Giraffe

The PMA400 is a PDA (Personal Digital Assistant) with a hard disk drive, audio and video playback, and recording capabilities.

It was released on Thursday May 26, 2005, and weighs 280 g.

The PMA400 was the most expensive within the line of products that they supplied. The product runs the Linux based Qtopia Embedded operating system.

=== Archos 2 ===
The Archos 2 was replaced by the "24 vision" from the "vision line".

Specifications

- Internal storage available in 8 GB and 16GB*
- Expandability MicroSD / MicroSDHC card slot
- Compatibility Windows or Mac and Linux (with mass storage support)
- Computer Interface USB 2.0 High Speed
- Screen Color 1.8" - 128x160 pixels
- Battery 10 hours music, 4 hours video
- Video Playback AVI (conversion needed)
- Music Playback MP3, WMA
- Photo Playback JPEG
- Recorder Records voice through the built-in microphone
- Other Selectable sound equalizer presets, Multilanguage Interface
- Extras Reads text files (.TXT) & lyrics files (.LRC)
- Physical Dimensions: 84mm x 41mm x 9mm, Weight: 50 grams

=== Gmini series ===
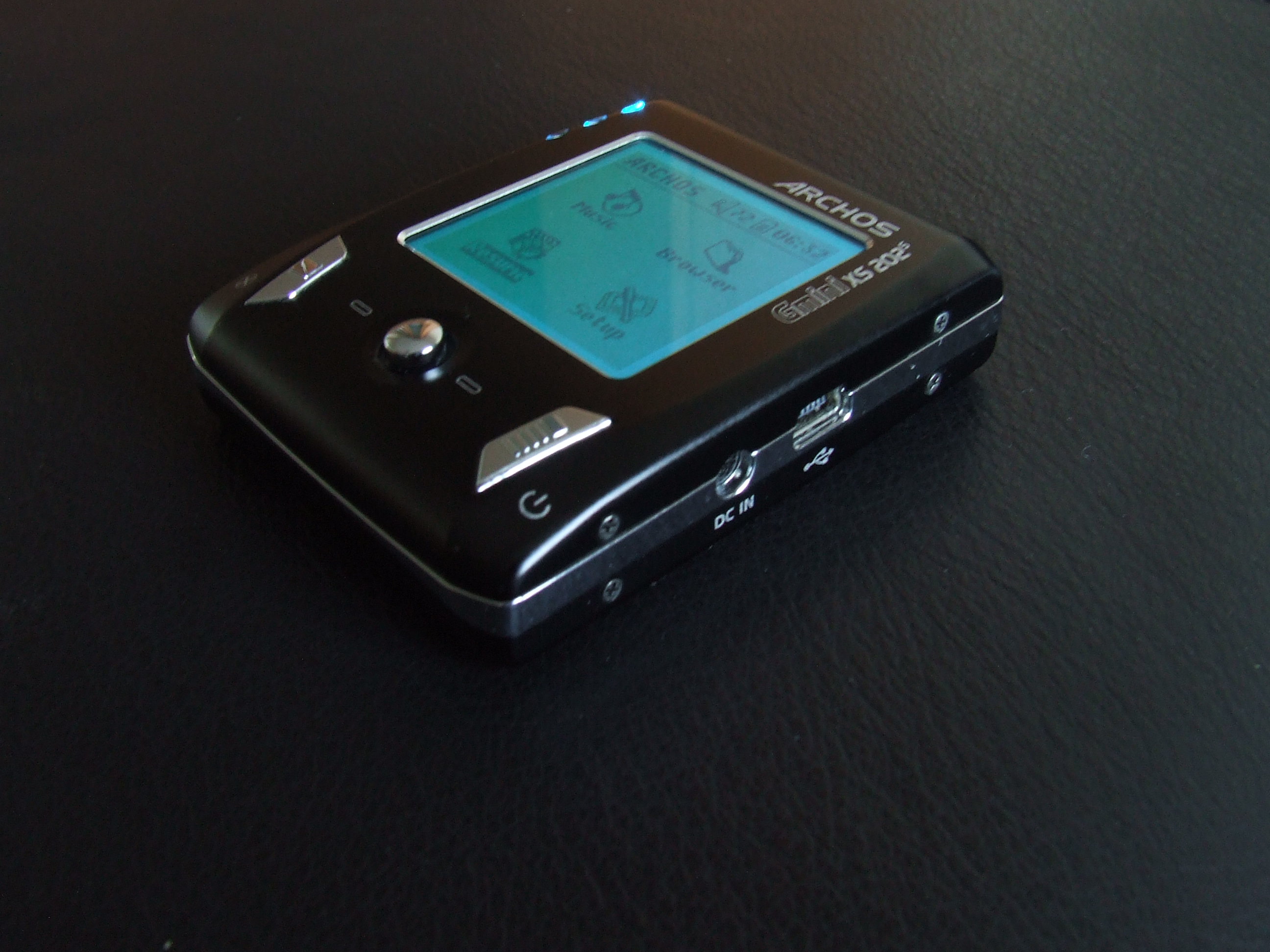
Archos Gmini XS 202s.

The Gmini series was introduced in October 2004. Its members are the Gmini 400, the 402, the AV500, the 120 and the XS100.

Gmini 400 has a color LCD screen as well as photo, audio and video playback capacities.

The Gmini 402 replaced the Gmini 400 featuring PlaysForSure compatibility. The Gmini 402 Camcorder was later introduced which includes a 1.2MP (Megapixel) digital camera, and has video recording capabilities, with up to a 2x digital zoom. The player also holds 3 resolution modes, which enables users to choose size over quality, as well as recording directly into MPEG4 in VGA resolution.

Just after the release of the AV500, the Archos Gmini 500 was released. It also has full support for Windows Media's PlaysForSure system which allows users to play DRM restricted music.

The Gmini 120 cannot play DRM-protected WMA files, and was also released as Archos Gmini SP. There is also an optional FM radio attachment available for this player so users can play and record directly from FM radio.

The Gmini XS 100 group of players features a 1.5" screen, and full PlaysForSure capabilities. The Gmini XS 200 has a monochrome screen that supports gapless playback. It was replaced by the Gmini XS 204, which adds a color screen and image viewing capabilities.

=== Jukebox series ===
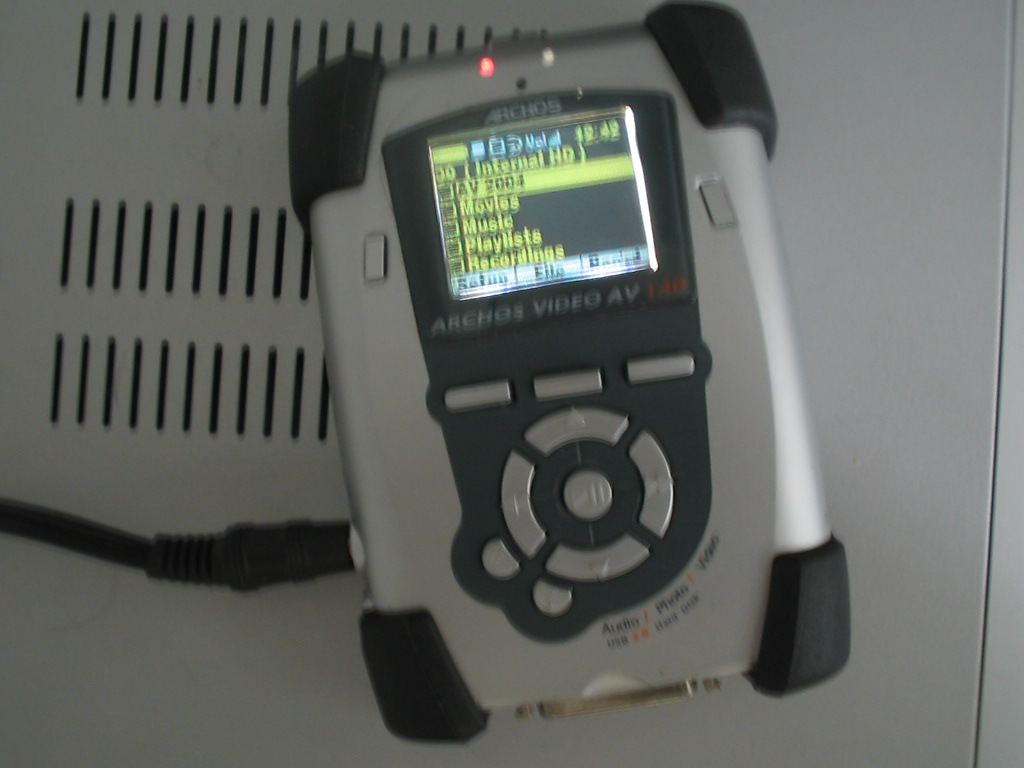
Archos Jukebox Multimedia

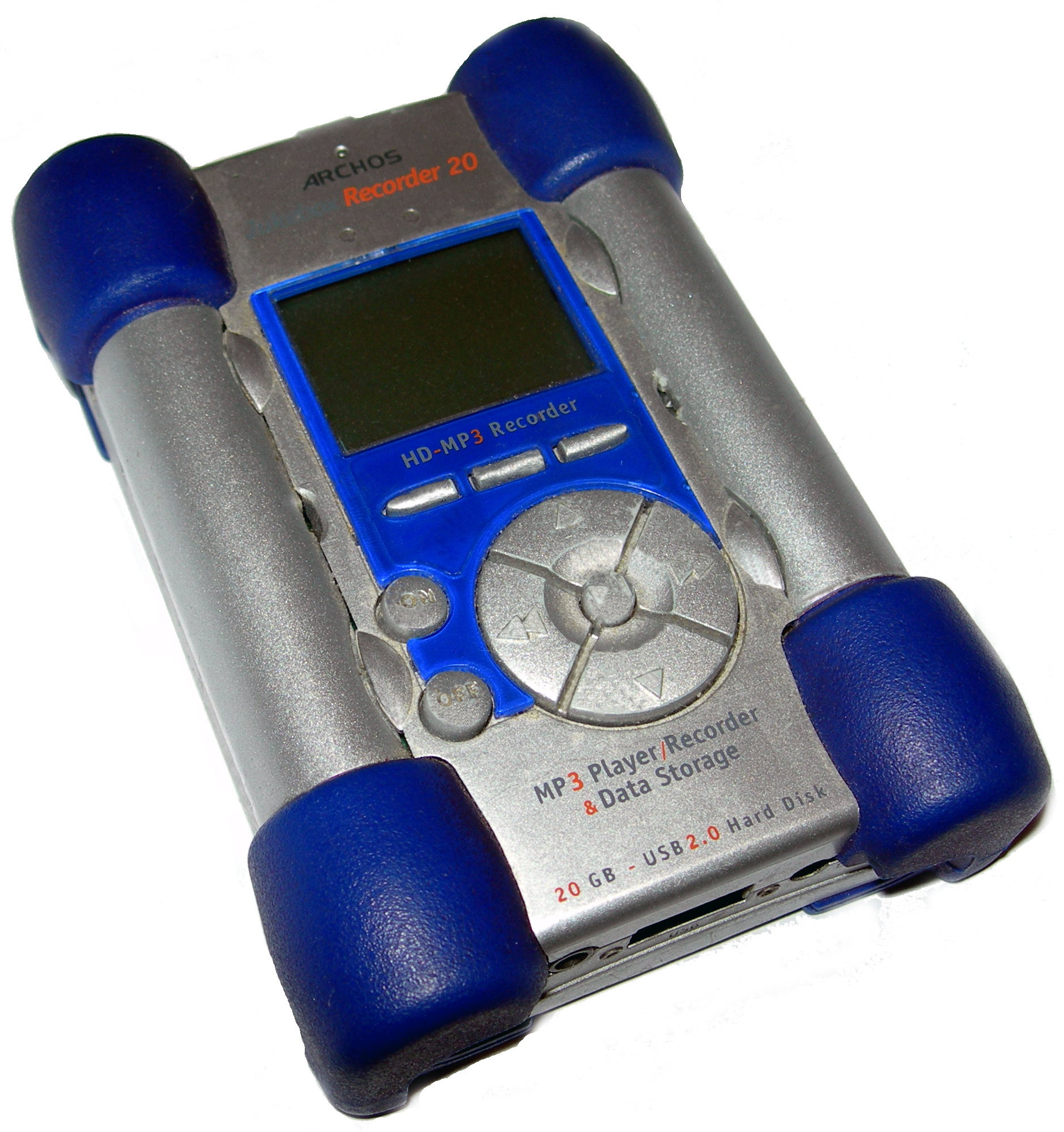
Archos Recorder 20

The Archos Jukebox 6000 was one of Archos' first portable media players, containing a 6 GB hard drive. This player is only MP3 compatible, and was bundled with Musicmatch Jukebox to allow users to rip their music collection onto the jukebox. The Jukebox Studio succeeded the Jukebox 6000.

The Archos Jukebox Recorder was similar to the Player/Studio models, but featured recording capabilities.

The Archos Jukebox Multimedia is the first official portable media player, which enabled users to upload digital camera content via accessory card readers that connected directly to the device's expansion port. It also featured an audio and video player, an image viewer, and appropriate AV cables included. The player also has the ability to record audio from a line-in source straight into MP3 format. The player features a 10 or 20 GB hard drive and uses DivX MPEG4 format for video recording and playback.

== Audio/radio devices ==
- FM Recorder

Similar to the Recorder model, but featured a Li-ion battery, an FM tuner and a slightly different case. 60 grams less weight.

- Recorder v2

Similar to the FM Recorder model, but featured no FM tuner (some of the earliest V2 models did in fact feature an FM tuner although it was not advertised nor used by the original firmware).

- Ondio SP

A flash-based MP3-player with bit-mapped 112x64 LCD. It is powered by three AAA-cells and features an MMC expansion slot and 128MB of internal memory. It is the smallest MP3 player in the Archos lineup.

Rockbox is supported on the Ondio devices.

- Ondio FM

Similar to the Ondio SP model but also features an FM tuner and recording capabilities.

== Portable storage devices ==
Though PVPs are their primary market, Archos has also released a number of different portable storage devices over the years. Their last devices were the ArcDisk series from 2005.

Model	Capacity	Main features	Connection	AC Adapter	Weight	Release
ArcDisk	20,40GB, now 120GB		USB 2.0	Optional	96g	May 17, 2005
ArcDisk 4 GB	4GB		USB 2.0	No	40g	May 13, 2005
MiniHD	20GB	20GB storage drive at release	USB 2.0	Optional	180g	June 4, 2002
QDisk	40,60,80,100, 120,160,250GB	Uses a laptop hard drive and comes in various sizes	USB 2.0	Yes	780g	September 17, 2002
ArcFire Zip	100,250MB	Uses Zip Disks	FireWire	No	55g	November 9, 2000
FireHD	20,40GB	Hot swappable	FireWire	Yes	750g	October 17, 2000
ArcFlash	128MB	an early USB Flash Drive	USB 1.1	No	14g	September 5, 2000

== Commodore Amiga peripherals ==
In the mid 1990s, Archos produced a range of peripherals for the Commodore Amiga range of computers.

- ColorMaster

The Archos ColorMaster was a graphics card for the Amiga 500, that increased the number of colours that could be displayed on the screen.

- Dual Video Port

The Archos Dual Video Port was a board that added a second RGB video port to the Amiga 4000.

- Avideo24

The Avideo24 was a graphics card for the Amiga 3000.

- Overdrive

The Overdrive was an external hard disk for the Amiga 600 and Amiga 1200.

- Overdrive CD

The Overdrive CD was an external CD-ROM drive for the Amiga 600 and Amiga 1200.

- Amen32

The Amen32 was a RAM expansion card for the Amiga 1200. It also provided a socket for an FPU.

- Add500 and Add2000

The Add500 and Add2000 were a SCSI controllers with FAST RAM expansion for the Amiga 500 and Amiga 2000 respectively.
