= Tom Ryan (business executive) =

American business executive (born 1969)

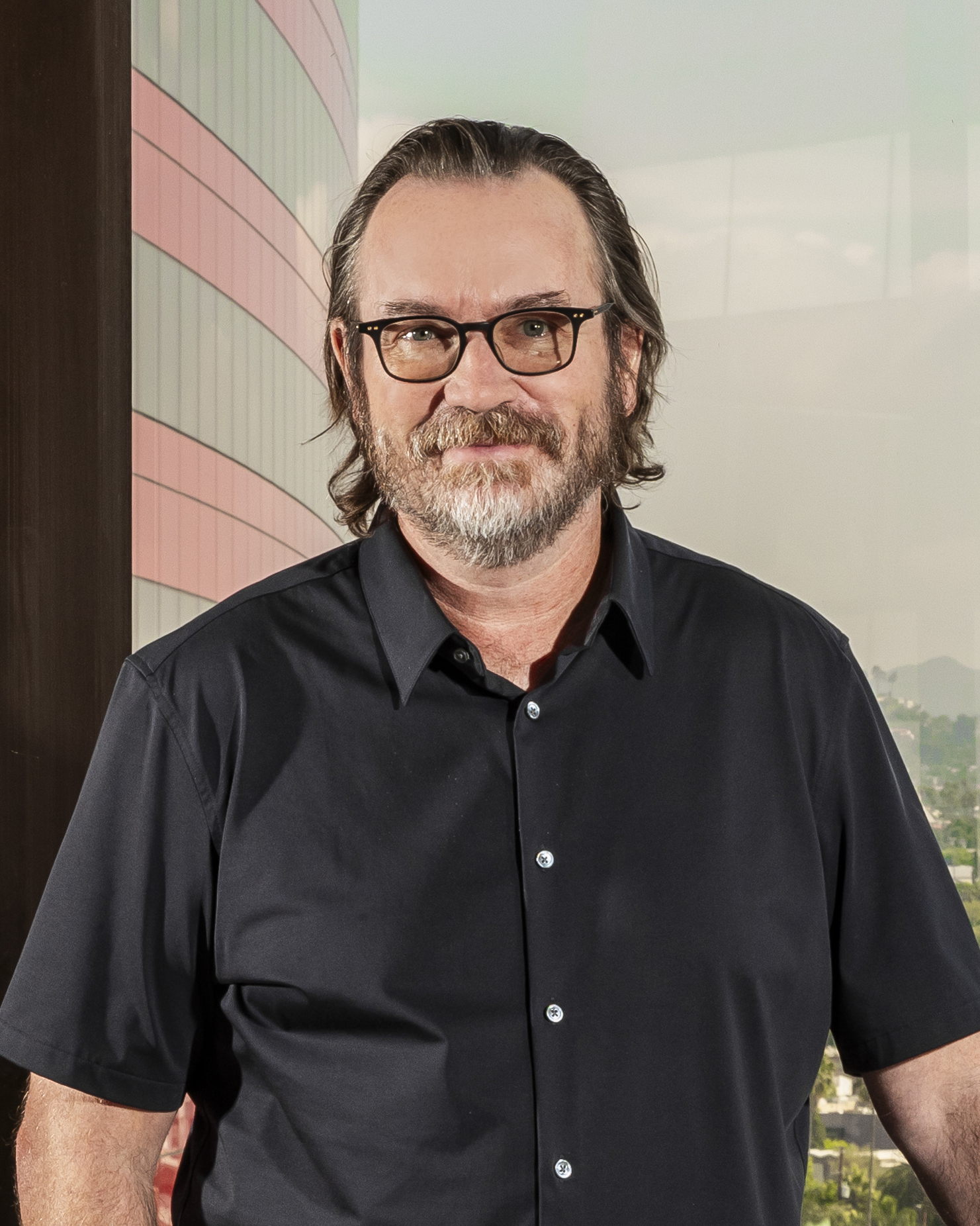
- Tom Ryan in 2024
- Born: Thomas V. Ryan; March 18, 1969 (age 57)
- Education: Dartmouth College INSEAD in France

Tom Ryan is the former CEO and President of Pluto TV and Streaming at Paramount Skydance Corporation.

== Education ==
Ryan has an AB from Dartmouth College and an MBA from INSEAD in France.

== Career ==
=== Early years ===
Tom Ryan's entrepreneurial career began in 1996 when he co-founded Cductive, an early digital music retail company that Ryan later sold to EMusic in 1999, that same year he became an advisor for EMusic. Following this, in 2002, he was a Mobile Music Consultant with Virgin Mobile USA. From 2004-2007, Ryan was the Senior vice-president of Digital Strategy at EMI Music. In 2007 he held the position of "Entrepreneur-in-Residence" of Bessemer Venture Partners until 2008. From 2008-2012, Ryan was CEO of the crowdsourced design community and e-commerce company, Threadless.

=== Pluto TV ===
In 2013, Ryan co-founded Pluto TV, making him one of the first to bring Free ad-supported streaming television (FAST) services to the market. It was launched in 2014. In 2019, he sold the company to Paramount (at the time ViacomCBS) for $340 million, and stayed on as CEO until August 2025. By 2021, Pluto TV had over $1 billion in annual revenue.

=== Paramount Global Streaming ===
In October 2020, Tom Ryan was named President and CEO of Streaming at Paramount Global (formerly known as ViacomCBS Streaming). In 2024, under his leadership, the direct-to-consumer segment had its first profitable quarter since the launch of Paramount+ in March 2021.

=== Board roles ===
Ryan is the current Chairman of the board of Struck Studio. He has been a founding board member of Smule, a social music site, since 2008. Ryan has been a Venture Advisor on the board of Felix Capital since 2015 and Fund Advisor of SignalFire since 2017. He was previously on the board of Society6, which was acquired by Leaf Group in 2013 from 2010-2013 and Trunk Club from 2011-2014. He was an angel investor in both Smule and Trunk Club.

== Recognition ==
In 2021, he was recognized as the Fastest Growing Brand in America for Paramount. In 2022, Ryan received the NATPE's inaugural "Award for Executive Leadership in Global Streaming". And was also a Variety500 Honoree from Variety. In 2023, Stream TV awarded Ryan "CEO of the Year" & awarded Pluto TV "Streaming Platform of the Year"; that same year Pluto TV received a Webby Award for the "People's Voice Winner" for Best Streaming Service. In 2024, the NATAS revealed that Pluto TV would receive the Technology and Engineering Emmy Awards for Pioneering Development of Manifest-based Playout for FAST. That same year he was named on both the LA500 and FAST30 lists.

=== Patent ===
Issued on February 9, 2016 on Methods and Systems for Generating and Providing Program Guides and Content.

== Personal life ==
Ryan lives in Los Angeles, California with his wife and three children.
