= Nick Grouf =

American entrepreneur

- Born: Nicholas Allen Grouf; New York, New York
- Education: Yale University, Harvard Business School
- Occupations: Investor, entrepreneur
- Employer(s): Co-founder, Alpha Edison
- Board member of: United Dwelling, Hammer Museum, Mojo Sports, Inc., NovaSigna, Trajal Harrell Dance Company, Walther School
- Spouse: Shana Eddy-Grouf

Nick Grouf is an American entrepreneur, investor, and philanthropist. Described as a "pioneer of the Web 1.0 generation", Grouf is the co-founder and managing director of Alpha Edison, a venture capital fund, and the founder of Clementine Capital, LLC, a technology-focused incubator.

Grouf co-founded Firefly, an outgrowth of the RINGO project at the MIT Media Lab. Firefly invented collaborative filtering and developed the first online collaborative recommendation software, and helped to define online privacy standards as a contributor to the Platform for Privacy Preferences. He later co-founded PeoplePC, which bundled personal computers with internet service and access to other discounted products and services, and Spot Runner, an internet-based platform to produce, buy, place, and distribute targeted cable TV ads. In 2013, he co-founded Pluto TV, which was sold to Viacom in 2019.

== Early life and education ==
Grouf was born and grew up in New York City. The son of Jon Grouf, a lawyer, and Dale Berger, an entrepreneur, he attended the Horace Mann School. He was interested in both music and business, and attended Yale University. He graduated with a degree in American Studies in 1990; his senior thesis, an opera, won Yale's Norman Holmes Pearson Prize.

After Yale, Grouf was accepted at the Harvard Business School. He deferred admission for three years, and instead returned to New York in September 1990, where he focused on media and technology as a business analyst at McKinsey and Company. In addition, he pursued a career as a musician, performing as a singer-songwriter. In 1993, he moved to Cambridge and enrolled at Harvard. Prior to earning his MBA in 1995, he served as an associate in Mergers & Acquisitions at Goldman Sachs.

== Career ==
=== Firefly ===
In January 1995, Grouf met David Waxman on a flight from San Francisco to Boston. Waxman, a master's candidate at the MIT Media Lab, was also a musician. They began working together shortly after they met, and in March 1995, with MIT professor Pattie Maes, engineer Max Metral, Upendra Shardanand, and Yezdi Lashkari, Grouf and Waxman founded Firefly. Originally known as Agents, Inc., Firefly invented collaborative filtering personalization technology which could predict a user's tastes based on previously gathered preferences. First focused on music, it launched as ffly.com in October 1995 and by 1996 it had built a community of more than 3 million users. As the CEO and president of Firefly, Entertainment Weekly wrote that Grouf gave "cold artificial intelligence a warm glow."

Firefly, which collected large amounts of personal data, implemented tools and systems for users to manage and note privacy preferences. Key contributors to OPS (Open Profiling Standard), the company developed the underlying data management technology which was later known as the P3P (Platform for Privacy Preferences). "In order for personalization technologies to be effective, people have to be in an environment they can trust," Grouf said in a 1998 interview.

In April 1998, the company was acquired by Microsoft, and Grouf and approximately 70 Firefly employees moved to Microsoft headquarters in Redmond, Washington to work on .NET. The Firefly Passport became the Microsoft Passport. Per the terms of the acquisition, Grouf remained at Microsoft for a year, serving in a role that Esther Dyson described as Microsoft's "privacy conscience."

=== PeoplePC ===
After leaving Microsoft, Grouf moved to Northern California, where he was an entrepreneur-in-residence at SoftBank Technology Ventures. In 1999, Grouf, Waxman and Metral founded PeoplePC, which bundled personal computers with internet service and access to discounted products and services and PeopleGive, a separate 501(C)3 entity which provided computers and connectivity to low income people. Initially funded by SoftBank in a round led by its partner, Brad Feld, the company's mission was to "democratize technology." Its business model included collective buying, which allowed the company to generate additional revenue from advertising, partnerships, and premium products.

In February 2000 the company announced that they would provide PCs and Internet access to all of the employees of Ford Motor Co. and Delta Air Lines, and in October it was announced that it would open European subsidiaries to enable overseas corporations and governments to offer their employees low-cost home computers and Internet access and later developed partnerships with Vivendi Universal, The New York Times, Blue Cross Blue Shield, and the National Trades Union of Singapore. PeoplePC donated internet access to low-income families through President Clinton's ClickStart initiative, and provided both computers and computer training to economically disadvantaged students through its PeopleGive program.

PeoplePC debuted on NASDAQ in August 2000, and in 2002 the company was acquired by Earthlink.

=== Spot Runner ===
In 2003, Waxman and Grouf reunited to work on IT and online-fundraising strategies for John Kerry's presidential campaign. As they researched the television advertising infrastructure, they encountered barriers which made the process of buying media and targeting ads difficult. Knowledgeable about keyword-based online advertising, such as Google Adwords, they realized that no similar program for television advertising had been developed. Based on their experience with the Kerry campaign, Grouf and Waxman founded Spot Runner, a service which allowed business to customize a pre-produced television ads, set a budget, and target specific markets. The commercials were run primarily on cable television, where they could be targeted from large urban areas to small suburban neighborhoods, and the platform recommended where and when the commercials would be most effective. The majority of the process was automated through a web interface. Fast Company wrote: "The pair wedded the democratic spirit that underpinned PeoplePC to a variation on the recommendation engine that powered Firefly. Call it Google AdWords for TV."

Grouf led the development of Spot Runner’s Malibu Media Platform, a marketplace for buying and selling national and regional ad time. Media buying agencies were concerned with the Malibu platform, which automated processes traditionally done through ad agencies, because “it would mean giving up their reason for being."

In 2009, investor WPP filed an unsuccessful lawsuit against Spot Runner. WPP claimed that Spot Runner's founders made secondary sales without disclosure to other investors, and that the company, its outside directors, and its major venture capital investors facilitated those sales. WPP's lawsuit against the company was dismissed by a federal court in October 2009; in 2010 WPP refiled the suit and it was again dismissed. In 2011, in addition to other claims, the US 9th Circuit Court of Appeals dismissed all of the shareholder derivative claims, and the insurers decided to settle the dispute on confidential terms. Spot Runner's Malibu Media Platform was acquired by Harris Broadcasting Communications in 2011.

=== Clementine Capital, Alpha Edison ===
In 2011, Grouf founded Clementine Capital, a Los Angeles-based technology incubator. Through Clementine, Grouf has provided resources, capital and strategic guidance for independent entrepreneurs and early-stage companies in both the consumer and business-to-business sector. Among others, he has worked with The BabyBox Company, Loot Crate, and Fig, which was acquired by eBay.

In 2016, Grouf teamed with former Goldman Sachs technology banker Michael Parekh and venture capitalist Nate Redmond to form Alpha Edison, a venture capital fund. In May, The Los Angeles Times reported that Alpha Edison was raising $300 million to invest in startups in addition to a $30 million side fund. Alpha Edison has invested in companies including United Dwelling, which helps homeowners convert underutilized garages or backyards into affordable housing, and House Canary, which uses AI for residential real estate data and home valuation.

== Philanthropy ==
Grouf has established scholarships related to social entrepreneurship and public health at Harvard University, Yale University, and the Horace Mann School. He also funded a neurology study at Cornell University. He has been affiliated with the National Center for Women and Information Technology and the education-focused SEED Foundation. He serves on the board of directors for The Hammer Museum, LAXART, Trajal Harrell Dance Company, and Larchmont Charter Schools. In 2014 Grouf helped to create the Walther School Foundation, where he also sits on the board.

== Personal life ==
Grouf and his wife, Shana Eddy-Grouf, live in Los Angeles. She is a senior executive at StudioCanal.
