= Urge (digital music service) =

Urge was an online music distribution service run by MTV Networks and was integrated into Windows Media Player (WMP) version 11.

Urge was first launched on May 17, 2006. Downloaded files came with restrictions on their use, enforced by Windows Media DRM, Microsoft's digital rights management. Urge featured the music programming of MTV, CMT (country), and VH1 and provided editorial content for the online music service. Urge charged 99¢ a track, or $9.95/month for a subscription. An optional $14.95/month to-go subscription was available for those with PlaysForSure devices. As of May 2008, Urge was not compatible with Microsoft's Zune or Apple's iPod, although the first-generation Zune Marketplace was based on Urge, and had many similarities.

In Spring 2007, MTV Networks launched the digital audio radio service Urge Radio, available as a cable radio service through a number of operators. Urge Radio offered cable systems digital audio channels with non-stop music, commercial-free, 24 hours a day. Similar to Music Choice, song and artist info is displayed on the TV screen.

In August 2007, MTV Networks announced plans to end its partnership with Microsoft and joined by RealNetworks on its Rhapsody digital music store.

In September 2010, Verizon and Frontier informed their customers that they would be removing Urge channels due to the provider's commitment to shut down the service.

== Features ==
=== Music downloads ===
At close, Urge had about 2.4 million songs available for download. Fans could download music for 99¢ a song or via one of the two subscription tiers. Subscription downloads allowed playback on three computers (also two PlaysForSure devices with the premium Urge To Go subscription). Devices and computers could be de-authorized through the account settings in Windows Media Player (WMP), allowing subscribers to change devices or computers. Subscribers may only de-authorize one PC and one device every 30 days.

There were several differences between songs downloaded through the subscription program and songs purchased though Urge. Purchased songs could be played repeatedly, regardless of whether the purchaser was still an Urge subscriber. Subscription music, on the other hand, became unplayable if the subscription lapsed. Subscription music also could not be burned to a CD while purchased music could. Additionally, purchased music could be copied to any WMA-enabled portable media player, not just those that are compatible with subscription services.

=== Urge To Go ===
Urge To Go was Urge's premium subscription service, allowing customers to sync all music downloaded from Urge to two PlaysForSure compatible devices. This is not compatible with Microsoft's Zune.

=== Internet radio ===
There were 36 free radio stations that can be accessed by anyone with Urge configured in WMP. With a subscription to Urge, 102 additional radio stations were available, providing a total of 138 radio stations as of July 2007.

=== Music videos ===
Streaming music videos were provided for the Urge service by MTV, VH1 and CMT. Songs which have corresponding videos are indicated by an icon to the left of the song title in Urge.

=== Auto-Mix, playlists and blogs ===
Urge provided several features to assist in discovering new music. The My Auto-Mix feature dynamically creates a playlist based on music each listener plays or adds to their library. Alternatively, playlists could be created based on mood, style or artist. Users can fine tune the results using three sliders for "popularity", "freshness" and "familiarity".

There were also playlists based on music, genres, celebrities, TV shows on MTV, VH1 and CMT and popularity.

In addition, Urge had 20 Informer blogs, which highlighted music from the three major networks (MTV, VH1 and CMT) as well as music from diverse genres in between from Afrobeat to Zydeco.

== Response ==
The music service was reviewed in several places. A CNET review gave the service a 7.0 on a 10-point scale. However, Urge has been criticized because it installs new "features" without the user's consent.

== Urge and Rhapsody merger ==
In August 2007, Urge informed its user base that the service would soon merge with the Rhapsody music service run by RealNetworks. On October 26, 2007, the integration between Windows Media Player (WMP) and Urge was removed. Current subscribers to the Urge subscription services (Urge All Access and Urge All Access To Go) were automatically transferred to Rhapsody, thus requiring the subscriber to download the Rhapsody software to access and use their account.

Any subscription tracks downloaded with the Urge music service in WMP (as with any subscription based track) required that the media usage rights be updated every month for the track to be operable. As a result, subscription tracks downloaded using Urge expired and the media usage rights were no longer updated. A subscription based user had to install the Rhapsody software, re-download their tracks and maintain their usage rights in the Rhapsody software as well as use Rhapsody to search for new music.

It was possible to change the preferences in Rhapsody to download tracks in .WMA format thus making those tracks playable in WMP. Urge users that paid by the track owned the media rights, but without any problems using the software to play those songs.

MTV Networks, Rhapsody, and Verizon Wireless partnered to integrate the VCAST Music service into Rhapsody as well, thus enabling users to take advantage of their Rhapsody account on their mobile device.

== List of Urge channels ==
- Acoustic Chill
- Adult Rock
- Alternative Rock
- Arena Rock
- Axis
- Blast
- Blue Room
- Bluegrass Radio
- Blues Part 2
- Christian
- CMT Radio
- CMT Wide Open Country
- Cinema
- Classic Country
- Classic R&B
- Classic Rap (uncensored)
- Classic Rock (uncensored)
- Celebration
- Comedy (uncensored)
- Cover to Cover
- Crescendo
- Crunch
- Dance Club
- Discotech
- Dope
- Dream Sequence
- Easy Listening
- Electronica
- Gospel
- Grind (Rhythmic Top 40)
- Hip-nod-ics
- I Love the '70s
- I Love the '80s
- I Love the '90s
- Jazzup Broadway
- Jazz Standards
- Jet Set
- Lounge Beats
- Latin Jazz
- Latin Hip-Hop
- Modern Pop
- Modern Rap
- Modern Soul
- MTV2 (Rock)
- MTV2 Headbangers Ball
- MTV Tr3s
- Manteca
- Meditation
- Neon
- Nick Kids
- Noggin
- NuGroove
- Oasis
- Opera Babylon
- Pegao
- Plush
- Pop Standards
- Praise
- R&B Hits
- Radio Alterna
- Ragga
- Reggae
- Reunion
- Rock Legends
- Rocks
- Say it Loud
- Showcase
- Smoke
- Smooth Jazz
- Soft Pop
- Solid Gold Oldies
- Soul City
- Swing
- Today's Top 40
- TRL
- Tejano
- Ultrasound
- Unforgettable
- VH1 Soul
- Vinyl
- Voice Box
- Zen
