= Pluto TV =

Free ad-supported streaming television service

- Logo used since 2024 (Note: The official logo for Pluto TV is yellow, this logo is black (or white in Wikipedia's dark theme) due to Wikipedia's accessibility reasons.)
- Company type: Subsidiary
- Website type: Entertainment; OTT platform
- Available in: Danish; English; Finnish; French; German; Italian; Japanese; Norwegian; Portuguese; Spanish; Swedish
- Founded: August 2, 2013; 13 years ago
- Headquarters: United States: West Hollywood, Los Angeles, California; Canada: Toronto, Ontario; Europe: Berlin, Germany
- Area served: United States (excluding U.S. Territories); Canada; Latin America; Most of Europe; Australia (via 10)
- Owner: Skydance
- Founders: Tom Ryan; Ilya Pozin; Nick Grouf
- Key people: Tom Ryan (President/CEO); Jeff Shultz (CBO); Olivier Jollet (Managing Director, Pluto TV Europe)
- Products: Streaming media; Video on demand; Television on demand
- Parent: Skydance Direct-to-Consumer
- Website: pluto.tv
- Advertising: Supported
- Registration: Optional
- Users: ▲80 million monthly active users (as of April 1, 2023)
- Launched: March 31, 2014; 12 years ago

Pluto TV is an American free ad-supported streaming television service owned and operated by the Direct-to-Consumer division of Skydance. Founded by Tom Ryan, Ilya Pozin and Nick Grouf in 2013 and based in Los Angeles, California, Pluto is available in the Americas and Europe. It primarily offers content through digital linear channels designed to emulate the experience of traditional broadcast programming. The service's revenue is generated from video advertisements seen during programming within commercial breaks structured similarly to those found on conventional television.

Pluto licenses its content directly from providers; as of March 2020, it had deals with 170 content partners providing approximately 425 channels and 100,000 unique hours worth of programming. In October 2020, Pluto TV became part of the newly created ViacomCBS Streaming (renamed Paramount Streaming in February 2022), both to be led by Pluto TV CEO Tom Ryan. Its content is available via its website and mobile apps on Android and iOS operating systems. As of April 2023, Pluto TV has a total of 80 million monthly active users.

Pluto TV has live channels based on Viacom properties like Nickelodeon, MTV, and Comedy Central since being acquired by the company. Aside from the Viacom channels, Pluto has licensed channels from companies like Crunchyroll and original channels like Pluto TV True Crime. Since Viacom's merger with CBS Corporation, Pluto has been a sister service to Paramount+ (previously known as CBS All Access) since March 2021. After the merger, CBS News 24/7 and CBS Sports HQ became live TV channels on Pluto.

== History ==
=== Early years (2014–2019) ===
Pluto TV first launched its beta website on March 31, 2014, and was co-founded by chairman and CEO Nick Grouf, Tom Ryan, and Ilya Pozin. Pluto TV was originally developed to provide curated channels of existing online content, offering a slate of nearly 100 categorized channels featuring content aggregated from various video-sharing platforms (including YouTube, Vimeo, and Dailymotion) as well as additional content provided through partnerships with original web content services and television networks (including Funny or Die, QVC, Refinery29, RocketJump and TYT Network). The service was initially owned by Pluto Inc., which, during the second half of 2013 and early 2014, had raised $13 million in series A funding from investors that included Universal Music Group, Sky plc, UTA Ventures, and venture capital firms U.S. Venture Partners (USVP), QueensBridge Venture Partners, Pritzker Group Venture Capital, Luminari Capital, Great Oaks Venture Capital and Chicago Ventures. On May 14, 2014, Pluto unveiled a digital video recorder feature on its website known as "myPluto"; users could "record" content by clicking a "save show" button that would archive content from the channel as it played.

On July 1, 2015, Pluto TV announced that it had signed a deal with Hulu (now Disney-owned) to distribute the ad-supported video content available for free on Hulu's website including current-season episodes of programs from ABC, NBC and Fox, recent and older classic television series, and domestic and foreign animated programs. Under the arrangement, Hulu handled advertising for content made available through Pluto TV. In the weeks preceding the Hulu deal, Pluto TV had separately reached content agreements with AOL, Endemol Beyond USA, Shout! Factory, Jukin Media and YouTube content channels Devin SuperTramp, Multicom, Around the World in 4K and Amazing Places on Our Planet to distribute their programming on the service. In October 2015, 20 additional channels featuring content from AwesomenessTV, Cracked, IGN, Just for Laughs, Legendary Digital Networks, Newsy, The Onion and DHX Media (now as WildBrain) were brought onto the service's lineup, bringing the total number of curated channels offered by Pluto to around 120.

On May 15, 2016, Pluto TV signed an agreement with Sony to make the Pluto TV app available on the PlayStation Store for download by users of the PlayStation 3 and PlayStation 4. In 2016, Pluto Inc. raised $30 million in series B venture capital funding from ProSiebenSat.1 Media, Scripps Networks Interactive, and venture capital firms Luminari Capital, Chicago Ventures and Third Wave Ventures, valuing the company at $140 million. The round was led by German television network ProSieben, with additional funding from telecommunications company Sky UK. On April 30, 2017, Pluto Inc. added a chief programming officer role, appointing Robert Magdlen—who formerly served as senior vice president of program strategy and acquisitions for the NBCUniversal-owned E! and as a production executive for WBD-based TNT—in the post, handling responsibilities for programming and channel development from the company's LA headquarters.

On May 15, 2017, Pluto TV launched a traditional video-on-demand offering, consisting a large library of films and television series licensed from such distributors as Metro-Goldwyn-Mayer, Lionsgate, Warner Bros., Viacom (which acquired the service itself two years later), Sony Pictures, Fremantle, Monstercat, King Features Syndicate along with two Canadian studios, Nelvana and DHX that are made available for individual viewing to Pluto users. Variety reported that as of May 2017, the service was averaging 6 million users per month, and, as of October 2017, it was rated one of the most-watched Roku Channels on Roku.

By October 2017, Pluto TV reached over 15 million users. On October 17 of that year, Pluto TV announced that it received a $5-million investment from Samsung Venture Investment Corporation as part of an $8.3 million round of funding raised by various investors. On March 15, 2018, Pluto TV entered into a partnership with SpotX to provide advertising monetization services for Pluto, including engendering sales from media buyers breaking into over-the-top content services. On July 19, 2018, Pluto TV announced an agreement with Sony Pictures Television to stream over 200 movies and TV shows from Sony Pictures. On August 1, 2018, Vizio launched a new ad-supported streaming platform powered by Pluto TV, called WatchFree. This service is built into several models of Vizio's line of Internet-connected smart TVs, particularly those supporting its SmartCast operating system, and is advertised as having "an easy-to-navigate, cable-like interface".

On October 1, 2018, Pluto TV expanded into parts of Europe, with the launch of a platform on Sky's Now TV service in the UK, offering an initial slate of more than 12 curated channels. Also in October 2018, Pluto TV picked Tru Optik to help with advertising inventory. On December 4, 2018, Pluto TV launched a regional service in Germany and Austria, also through a separate collaborative agreement with Sky, with the app's content made available initially via the Sky TV stick; the German/Austrian service originally incorporated a slate of 15 streaming channels (consisted of both Pluto-exclusive services with both German and English-language content as well as channels compiled by third-party content providers).

=== Ownership by Viacom and its successors (2019–present) ===
On January 22, 2019, Viacom (with CBS re-merging months later) announced its intention to acquire Pluto TV for $340 million. Viacom's plans for Pluto TV included using the service as a marketing tool for its portfolio of linear media brands (including incorporating more licensed content from Viacom-owned properties) and to serve as a distribution outlet for its in-house digital content brands (such as AwesomenessTV), expanding the service into Latin America, and entering into partnerships with internet and mobile providers to cross-promote the service, and offer advertising inventory and revenue sharing. The deal was completed on March 4, 2019. On March 18, 2019, Viacom (through its Viacom International Media Networks (VIMN) unit) announced plans to launch Pluto TV worldwide; VIMN President James Currell explained that the company believed the global Subscription Video on Demand (SVOD) sector was "becoming too crowded and capital intensive," choosing to focus on building scale through ad-supported streaming platforms.

On May 1, 2019, Pluto introduced branded channels based on Viacom Media Networks-owned cable outlets and other Viacom properties, including content from Paramount Pictures (films only), Nickelodeon (kid-aimed), BET (African American-aimed), Comedy Central, VH1, Logo, TV Land and MTV (music-aimed), along with Spike-branded channels based on the network's past formats of men's interest and outdoors programming. The free channels are not simulcasts of their namesake networks, as contractual restrictions with traditional pay television providers prevent it from distributing the full linear feeds, but instead focus primarily on archival content and series that Pluto TV has acquired from other content providers. Some of these branded services are direct offshoots of their linear counterparts, while others (such as CMT, Cheer 24/7, TV Land Sitcoms, TV Land Drama, MTV Teen, VH1: I Love Reality, and Nickelodeon offshoots Dora TV and Totally Turtles) maintain theme formats offering specialty programming owned by Viacom and other program library partners.

On June 13, 2019, Pluto TV was launched on Comcast's Xfinity X1 cable boxes. On July 1, 2019, the service launched a Spanish-language programming tier, Pluto TV Latino, consisting initially of eleven Spanish and Portuguese-language channels (including two sports-focused channels, Lucha Libre and Combate World, that were previously assigned to the service's main sports tier) that incorporate programming originally produced natively in those languages and Spanish-dubbed versions of English and Portuguese programs.

Pluto TV's logo used from 2016 until March 1, 2020; a variant featuring the "TV" dot in the same size as the rest of the text was used from 2018 until the second logo was introduced.

On August 13, 2019, National Amusements announced that Viacom and CBS Corporation—which had split into two separate companies in 2005, five years after the original Viacom first acquired CBS's assets—would recombine their assets into a singular entity to be named ViacomCBS in a deal valued at up to $15.4 billion. Following the announcement, Deadline Hollywood, citing sources within the company, identified Pluto TV as a potential outlet for CBS streaming content. Pluto had recently carried CBS News's CBSN, and technology and video-game-oriented CNET Video. Additional channels from CBS, including the New York and Los Angeles services, and an Entertainment Tonight-branded entertainment news channel (ET Live), were added to the service on November 13, 2019, prior to the completion of the merger.

Pluto TV's logo used from January 7, 2020, to January 28, 2024. Still in use on hourly idents of some channels.

In September 2019, Pluto TV became available on mobile platforms in four European countries: Germany, Austria, Switzerland and the UK; the service first became available in those countries on iOS and Apple TV devices on September 6, and on Android devices on September 24. By November 2019, the service was estimated to have 20 million monthly active users.

On February 3, 2020, ViacomCBS announced that Pluto TV would launch in Latin America at the end of March, offering 17 channels available in two languages, Spanish and Portuguese at launch; additional channels would be added on a monthly basis with more than 80 channels expected to be available by the end of 2020. Alongside content carried by ViacomCBS Networks International-owned local versions of its corporate parent's US media properties, co-owned Argentine network Telefe and Porta dos Fundos would also provide content for the service. The service was expected to launch in Brazil in December 2020, but was anticipated and was launched on November 17, 2020.

In January 2020, Pluto TV unveiled a new logo at CES 2020, and later unveiled a redesign of its Apple iOS apps, which included a new channel guide and on-demand menu interface. The redesigned interface—finally removes the new logo—was rolled out to the website and desktop app the following day on February 21, its Roku app on February 26, and Android devices and other platforms on March 2.

On February 20, 2020, ViacomCBS estimated that Pluto TV generated a monthly average of 22 million viewers in the fourth quarter of 2019, with expectations of its user base reaching 30 million monthly viewers by December 2020. The company also announced that Pluto content would be incorporated into a revamped version of CBS All Access, which would also add content from ViacomCBS Domestic Media Networks cable properties, Paramount Pictures and CBS Television Distribution. ViacomCBS CEO Bob Bakish stated that Pluto TV—which will remain a free, standalone offering—would be part of the company's refocusing on three core streaming services, alongside the subscription-based CBS All Access and Showtime's OTT service, which would act as its mid-level and premium offerings and which Pluto will also be used to upsell along with ViacomCBS's other niche streaming platforms.

On July 9, 2020, the service launched an app for Virgin Media customers in the UK. (Note: The app is available, free of charge for all customers on Virgin Media in the UK.) On October 8 of that same year, ViacomCBS announced Pluto TV's launch in Spain, Italy and France, with 40 channels and thousands of hours of on-demand content.

On July 17, 2021, Pluto TV added several new channels including News 12 New York, Pluto TV Home, and Professional Bull Riders' RidePass. A deal made between Pluto TV and PBR allowed for Pluto TV to be the exclusive home to RidePass content.

On September 29, 2021, Pluto TV's parent ViacomCBS agreed to pay $3.5 million and enter into a consent decree with the FCC to provide clear and accessible closed captioning, which would often not be passed down to the consumer via Pluto TV apps or websites despite either being part of a program already or being captioned by the live programming provider. The FCC's determined the service had not implemented proper and visible settings to allow the passthrough of captions, removed captioning capabilities, and did not maintain email or telephone captioning support hotlines required by the FCC to address viewer complaints. Under FCC rules, all nonexempt full-length video programming delivered over the Internet must present closed captions if originally aired over American television with captioning, if the programming had previously been shown on television in the U.S. with captions. This effectively applies to most television programming created after 1984, along with the 1990 Television Decoder Circuitry Act of 1990, which mandated a requirement for captions to be accessible on all but the smallest televisions.

On November 29, 2021, ViacomCBS announced that Pluto TV would launch in Sweden, Norway and Denmark by 2022 as part of a joint venture with Nordic Entertainment Group, phasing out the company's existing AVOD service Viafree upon launch. On March 16, 2022, it was announced that the launch date of Pluto TV in the three countries will be on May 18, 2022.

On February 16, 2022, Pluto TV's parent company, ViacomCBS Streaming, was renamed Paramount Streaming, in-line with the rebranding of parent company ViacomCBS to Paramount Global.

On May 18, 2022, Pluto TV was launched in the Nordics through a partnership with Viaplay Group (formerly called Nordic Entertainment Group). On July 13, 2022, Pluto TV added five new channel categories: Game Shows, Daytime TV, Home, Food, and Lifestyle & Culture, and two new channels: Let's Make a Deal and The Judge Judy Channel. Additional channels devoted to Jeopardy! and Wheel of Fortune were added in August 2022.

On September 1, 2022, Pluto TV launched two new channels, the 2K-themed movie channel, dubbed "00s Replay", and The Ed Sullivan Show. More channels were added throughout the month: CSI: Miami and its spin-off CSI: NY, launched on September 13, 60 Minutes launched on September 24, and Hallmark Movies & More and Rachael Ray launched on September 26. On October 31, 2022, Pluto TV announced that it would add 6,300 episodes of classic CBS-distributed series to its on-demand library by the end of 2022, including Cheers, Criminal Minds, Frasier, and Star Trek.

On December 1, 2022, Pluto TV launched in Canada in partnership with Corus Entertainment, which is handling marketing and Canadian advertising sales. Corus also contributed channels to the service that are drawn from its networks and libraries, such as Global News, Property Brothers, Anna Olson, and Bryan Baeumler. The next day, the service added additional Christmas-related channels for the holiday season, as well as More Star Trek, Confess by Nosey, and AMC en Español. On December 15, 2022, Pluto TV launched a new advertising campaign featuring talk show host/actress Drew Barrymore.

On April 11, 2023, Pluto TV launched the Latin-aimed CBS Sports Golazo Network in the United States to take advantage of Paramount Global's worldwide soccer rights, including discussion shows and live games.

On November 1, 2023, Paramount announced that Pluto TV would merge with My5 in the UK, with its full launch date set to be planned for the second half of 2024. Paramount later called off the merger on August 20, 2024, opting to relaunch My5 in 2025 and keep Pluto TV as a separate service. My5 and Channel 5 were both rebranded to simply 5 in that year.

In October 2024, the service announced a new partnership with NBCUniversal Global TV Distribution.

As of December 2024, according to Media Technology Monitor, Pluto TV was the most popular free ad-supported streaming television (FAST) service in Canada.

In April 2025, Pluto TV announced the addition of The Martha Stewart Channel, The Emeril Lagasse Channel, and ALLBLK Gems to its permanent channel lineup.

After the Paramount–Skydance merger was completed on August 7, 2025, CEO David Ellison stated that Pluto TV and Paramount+ (along with Warner Bros. Discovery's streaming service HBO Max if Paramount Skydance's planned merger with WBD goes through) will move to a unified technology stack beginning in 2026. While he did not rule out the possibility of consolidating the two or three services into a single app in the future, Ellison has only confirmed the backend integration at this stage. After Paramount Skydance further acquired Warner Bros. Discovery on October 6, 2026, one of the terms in the settlement of an antitrust suit related to Paramount Skydance's acquisition of Warner Bros. Discovery requires Pluto TV to be maintained as a free service through 2031.

== Programming ==
Pluto TV is structured similarly to the traditional cable television model, offering its content as designated channels categorized by program content type into different channel categories:

Current categories

- Featured – new channels and special event content;
- Movies – film channels, consisting of both general-format and genre-based (such as comedy, action, horror) services;
- Comedy – comedy-based services, consisting of stand-up, sitcom/sketch comedy, and curated viral video channels;
- Classic TV – channels focused on vintage TV shows and cartoons, mostly comedies;
- Westerns;
- Sci-Fi – channels focusing on sci-fi shows (introduced October 2023);
- Drama – channels focusing on shows in the drama genre (introduced October 2023);
- True Crime – channels about true crime documentaries (introduced October 2023);
- Reality – reality and competition shows;
- Entertainment – varied general and specialty entertainment-based programming;
- Game Shows – game shows, mostly classic series (introduced in July 2022);
- Daytime TV – channels focusing on soap operas, along talk, court and lifestyle programs (introduced in July 2022);
- News + Opinion – mainstream news and opinion channels;
- Sports – live and previously aired events, sports-themed news and analysis programs;
- History + Science – channels focusing on historical events and science;
- Home + Food – channels focusing on lifestyle;
- Animals + Nature – channels focusing on outdoors and wildlife;
- Kids – channels aimed at children and young teenagers;
- Anime – Japanese animation (mostly subbed);
- En Español – Spanish-language channels;
- Music Videos – music videos and video concerts (audio-based music channels from Dash Radio were previously among the selections, but they were dropped in July 2020 and replaced by Vevo);
- Local News – Regional news channels and geolocated stations (including CBS News Local services such as LA and New York)

Seasonal channels

- Season's Greetings – Pop-up Christmas-themed movie and Yule Log channels that operate from November 1 to December 31; in November 2023, Pluto TV acquired streaming rights to the Chicago Thanksgiving Parade for broadcast on one of the seasonal channels.

Former categories

- Explore – travel, lifestyle, historical, science and special-interest channels.

As of January 2, 2026, Pluto TV carries approximately 425 channels, packaging content acquired through various content syndication deals, as well as programming from Skydance's internal libraries. Traditional television channels whose feeds are carried directly on Pluto include WeatherNation TV, Newsmax TV, Dabl (until late 2023 because of OTA channel's ethnically diverse-aimed, comedy-focused transition), Bloomberg Television, Sky News, Ion Television, Professional Bull Riders' RidePass, Eleven Sports (albeit with some events replaced with alternative programming due to streaming rights restrictions), Stadium and TheBlaze. AVOD services whose feeds are carried on Pluto include CBS News 24/7, CBS Sports HQ, ET Live, Fox Sports, LiveNow from Fox, Nosey, NBC News Now, Scripps News (short-form Scripps News Briefs are inserted into commercial breaks on other Pluto channels), Cheddar News, TYT Network, People TV and the religious-owned TBN, In addition, Pluto also offers "pop-up channels," which maintain binge-viewing or specialty programming formats that operate on a temporary or open-ended basis.

== Availability ==
Pluto TV content can be streamed through a number of desktop, mobile and internet-connected TV platforms, including: Android and Apple iOS/iPadOS devices, Android TV, Apple TV, Amazon Fire TV, Roku, Cox Contour Stream Player, Vizio SmartCast, PlayStation 4, PlayStation 5, Xbox One, Xbox Series X/S, webOS, Chromecast, Virgin Media (TV 360 & Stream only), macOS and Windows computers and Meta Quest. Pluto-operated channels are also offered through The Roku Channel's live TV section.

In Canada, Pluto TV was available in a limited capacity due to existing program rights held by broadcasters. In June 2022, it was announced that Paramount would partner with Corus Entertainment to relaunch the service locally in late 2022, with Corus serving as ad-sale representative and providing library content to the service. Pluto TV was officially relaunched in Canada on December 1, 2022. During the Canadian launch event on December 1, 2022, executive VP and international general manager Olivier Jollet told The Hollywood Reporter that they plan to launch Pluto TV channels in Australia by August 2023 (through Paramount's existing BVOD service 10Play) and are exploring expansion into other European and Asian territories.

== See also ==
- 5 (streaming service)
- 10 (VoD service)
