= Spot Runner =

- Industry: Advertising
- Founded: 2003
- Founders: Nick Grouf; David Waxman
- Fate: Acquired 2011
- Headquarters: Los Angeles, USA
- Area served: Worldwide

Spot Runner was an American advertising and technology company. An automated web-based service, Spot Runner allowed businesses to inexpensively create and air personalized ads in their local markets through a self-service package of commercial production, media planning and ad placement without the assistance of media buyers or advertising agencies. The company was founded in 2003.

== History ==
Spot Runner was founded by Nick Grouf and David Waxman, who first met in 1995. They went on to found Firefly, which was sold to Microsoft, and then PeoplePC, which was sold to EarthLink. After working separately for a brief period, Waxman and Grouf reunited to integrate technology into John Kerry's 2004 presidential campaign. Several months later they founded Spot Runner to provide a set of services for small and medium businesses which were similar to what agencies did for their larger clients, such as personalized spots and targeted media planning. "It was a market no one was paying attention to," Grouf stated in 2006.

Spot Runner allowed businesses to buy a pre-produced television ad, customize it, set a budget and target specific markets through an automated online system. The company developed an algorithm which recommended where to place ads to maximize effectiveness, allowing business to target even small neighborhoods. Accomplished through a web-interface, the process took days rather than months, and advertising costs were significantly reduced. In 2006 Fast Company wrote: "In other words, the pair wedded the democratic spirit that underpinned PeoplePC to a variation on the recommendation engine that powered Firefly. Call it Google AdWords for TV. And while Grouf and Waxman would be quick to tell you that their mission is to make TV advertising affordable to everyone, in delivering this level of efficiency, transparency, and control to the messy old-school world of TV ads, they may actually be onto something much bigger. If you thought the ad world was under siege already, just wait until you see the havoc these geeks may wreak." In Mashable, Pete Cashmore wrote "Spot Runner is a huge, huge, HUGE idea."

A $7 million round of Series A investments in Spot Runner, announced in January 2006, was co-led by Index Ventures and Battery Ventures. Within a month of the company's launch, it had signed a deal with Cendant's real estate division, effectively creating a self-service advertising agency; 260,000 Coldwell Banker, Century 21, ERA, and other real estate agents had access to hundreds of customized Spot Runner ads. A Series B investment round was led by the same venture capitalists as well as Cendant and Allen & Company in early 2006. Later that year, three of the world's largest buyers and sellers of advertising, including CBS Corporation, Interpublic Group, and WPP as well as Allen & Company, Tudor Investment Corporation, Capital Research and Management, media executive Lachlan Murdoch and financier Vivi Nevo made equity investments in the company.

As the company grew, Spot Runner expanded their business model and began to develop the Malibu Media Platform, a transparent exchange/marketplace for national media inventory including television and radio, and global partnerships were formed with media buyers and media owners as the platform was built out. However, as the advertising market began to decline in the wake of the economic collapse of 2008 and 2009, Spot Runner's support from a segment of the advertising industry began to shift. MarketWatch reported that media buying agencies were concerned with the Malibu platform, which automated processes traditionally done through ad agencies, because “it would mean giving up their reason for being."

In 2009, investor WPP filed an unsuccessful lawsuit against Spot Runner. WPP claimed that Spot Runner's founders made secondary sales without disclosure to other investors, and that the company, its outside directors, and its major venture capital investors facilitated those sales. WPP's lawsuit against the company was dismissed by a federal court in October 2009; in 2010 WPP refiled the suit and it was again dismissed. In 2011, in addition to other claims, the US 9th Circuit Court of Appeals dismissed all of the shareholder derivative claims, and the insurers decided to settle the dispute on confidential terms. Several months after WPP's initial action, an arbitration panel determined that Adam Shaw had not been allowed to exercise stock options earned as the Spot Runner Founder.

In 2011, Spot Runner's Malibu Media Platform was acquired by Harris Broadcasting Communications.
