= Total Music =

Digital music distribution service

Total Music was a digital music distribution service created by Universal Music Group and Sony BMG. It was started in 2007 and closed down in 2009. The venture never actually resulted in any products or services used by consumers.

Total Music was initially conceived as a subscription service which would offer downloads of DRM-laden audio files to consumers. The subscription was to be incorporated into the price of digital audio playback devices; consumers would buy the device and get a "free" subscription, enabling access, for a limited time, to the participating record labels' catalogs. This plan was scrapped when an anti-trust inquiry by the United States Department of Justice in early 2008 expressed concern that the major record companies were colluding to provide an unfair advantage to Total Music.

Total Music was then conceived as a streaming service to be incorporated into social networking sites—particularly Facebook—in a model similar to what was already in place through agreements between the record companies and MySpace: in exchange for user data and advertising revenue, Total Music would grant the social network a license to use the participating labels' music. To provide a back end, Total Music acquired Ruckus Network, and EMI was brought on to add to Universal and Sony BMG's catalog, but Warner Music Group, the remaining major label, did not want to participate. More importantly, Total Music was unable to get Facebook to agree to hand over user data and ad revenue.

Layoffs ensued, and Ruckus was closed down. Soon after, Total Music itself was shuttered.

In its final months, the company also experimented with providing a streaming service widget for websites and blogs. The widget never made it out of beta.
