= Microsoft PlaysForSure =

Microsoft certification

Playsforsure logo

Microsoft PlaysForSure was a certification given by Microsoft to portable devices and content services that had been tested against several hundred compatibility and performance requirements. These requirements include codec support, digital rights management support, UI responsiveness, device performance, compatibility with Windows Media Player, synchronization performance, and so on. PlaysForSure certification was available for portable media players, network-attached digital media receivers, and media-enabled mobile phones. The PlaysForSure logo was applied to device packaging as well as to online music stores and online video stores.

PlaysForSure was introduced in 2004. In 2007, Microsoft rebranded and scaled back "PlaysForSure" into the subset Certified for Windows Vista.

Microsoft's Zune worked only with its own content service called Zune Marketplace, not PlaysForSure. The Zune and PlaysForSure music were both Certified for Windows Vista, yet the Zune could not play PlaysForSure music purchased from the MSN Music store.

Microsoft announced that as of August 31, 2008, PlaysForSure content from their retired MSN Music store would need to be licensed to play before this date or burned permanently to CD, although this decision was later reversed. With the exception of Windows Media Player, all of the PlaysForSure offerings were made or run by 3rd-party companies, while Microsoft's Entertainment and Devices Division developed and marketed the Zune.

== Overview ==
There exist many tests to obtain PlaysForSure certification. The most commonly referenced requirements include the ability to play files encoded in Windows Media Audio or Windows Media Video format with Windows Media DRM digital rights management, used by Windows Media Player versions 10 and 11. For this, portable devices must implement Janus (WMDRM-PD), and network-attached devices must implement an interface to Cardea (WMDRM-ND). However, other important requirements include time to synchronize a device with a PC, UI performance (time between pressing "play" and hearing music), gapless playback, and so on.

== Content providers that offered PlaysForSure-certified content ==
Only audio content were ever offered by PlaysForSure content providers; although Microsoft provided a PlaysForSure certification for video content, as well as a variety of PlaysForSure-certified portable and network video players that could play PlaysForSure-certified video, if it were offered, no online store offered video content that would be certified to play on all PlaysForSure video players.

- SoundsRightNow.com
- AOL MusicNow (closed)
- Yahoo! Music Unlimited (closed)
- Spiralfrog (closed)
- MTV URGE (closed)
- MSN Music (closed)
- Musicmatch Jukebox (closed)
- Wal-Mart Music Downloads (switched to MP3)
- Ruckus Network (closed)
- PassAlong Networks (closed)
- Rhapsody (switched to MP3)
- Napster To Go
- iMesh (switched to MP3)
- BearShare (switched to MP3)

== Hardware vendors that support PlaysForSure-certified media ==
- Archos
- Cingular
- Cowon
- Creative Labs
- Dell
- Denon
- Digitrex
- D-Link
- Ericsson
- iriver
- Kyocera
- Motorola
- Nokia
- Palm
- Pioneer
- Philips
- Roku
- RCA
- Samsung
- SanDisk
- Sonos
- Sony
- Toshiba

== Software that can stream media to PlaysForSure devices ==
- Windows Media Player versions 10 and 11
- SimpleCenter supports the media devices iPod, Sony PSP, Xbox 360, Nokia N80, N93, USB mass storage, and PlaysForSure certified devices".

== Criticisms ==
A 2005 court case strongly criticised the wording of a Microsoft licensing agreement related to portable devices. The license prohibited makers of portable devices compatible with Windows Media Player from using non-Microsoft audio encoding formats. Microsoft indicated that the wording of their license was poorly written due to an oversight by a junior Microsoft employee. Microsoft quickly amended their stringently worded license agreement at the judge's behest.

Because the device management of PlaysForSure is sometimes difficult, it's sometimes called "PlaysNotSure". PlaysForSure is still difficult to compete with iPod, later Microsoft released Zune in 2006.

== See also ==
- Media Transfer Protocol
