= Mark C. Rosenthal =

American business executive

- Born: c. 1951 (age 74–75); United States
- Education: Kenyon College; Yale University
- Occupation: Business executive
- Known for: Former executive at: MTV Networks; Current TV; Interpublic; Spot Runner; Katz Media Group

Mark C. Rosenthal is an American business executive who was the president and COO of MTV Networks from 1996 to 2004 and the CEO of Current TV from 2009 to 2011. He also served as an executive for Interpublic, Spot Runner, and as CEO of the Katz Media Group. He is now Executive Chairman of Locality.

== Career ==
Rosenthal began his career in 1980 working at CBS Cable, the arts and cultural network begun by CBS. In 1982, he joined the Warner-Amex Satellite Entertainment Company, the predecessor of Viacom's MTV Networks. He became executive vice president for affiliate sales and marketing for MTV Networks in the early 1990s. In August 1996, he was appointed to the newly created position of president and COO of MTV Networks where he was responsible for all of the day-to-day global business operations of the company and its properties which included MTV, VH1, Nickelodeon, TV Land, and other cable networks. During Rosenthal's tenure, the company added Comedy Central and CMT (among others) to its list of properties.

In July 2004, he resigned his post at MTV Networks. At the time of his departure, the company had grown to make over $5 billion in annual revenue. In May 2005, he was hired as the chairman and CEO of media operations at the Interpublic Group (IPG) where he oversaw agencies like Universal McCann, Initiative Worldwide, and Magna Global. The new corporate entity he was in charge of eventually became Interpublic Media. In July 2006, Rosenthal took a medical leave of absence to treat colon cancer. In October 2006, IPG made the decision to dissolve Interpublic Media, and Rosenthal helped with the transition until leaving IPG at the end of 2006.

In April 2007, Rosenthal was asked to join the board of CNET. The following April, he was hired by Spot Runner to become vice chairman and president of that company's media platforms. At the company, Rosenthal oversaw the media-buying platform known as Project Malibu. In July 2009, he left Spot Runner to become the CEO of Current TV. Rosenthal had been on the company's board of directors for 4 years before his appointment to CEO. During his time at Current, Rosenthal oversaw a shift in content, opting for more long-form and investigative programming focusing on news analysis, political commentary, and documentaries. He was also responsible for recruiting Keith Olbermann to the network. In May 2011, Joel Hyatt, who co-founded Current with Al Gore and had been the company's CEO prior to Rosenthal, became co-CEO with Rosenthal. Rosenthal left Current two months later.

In September 2013, Rosenthal was appointed as the CEO of the Katz Media Group which is owned by iHeartMedia. At the time, the company represented over 3,000 radio stations and over 700 TV stations in the U.S. and Canada. In 2015, Rosenthal oversaw the creation of the first programmatic advertising platform for radio using Jelli technology called "Expressway". He ultimately decided to leave his post as CEO of Katz in March 2017, but stayed on at iHeartMedia in an advisory role. Since 2022, Rosenthal has served as the Executive Chairman of Locality, a local video solutions provider to advertisers, as well as a Senior Advisor to One Equity Partners.

== Other positions ==
Rosenthal is also on the board of trustees for Kenyon College and is on the board of directors for Jazz at Lincoln Center and The Public Theater.
