= David B. Pakman =

American businessman (born 1969)

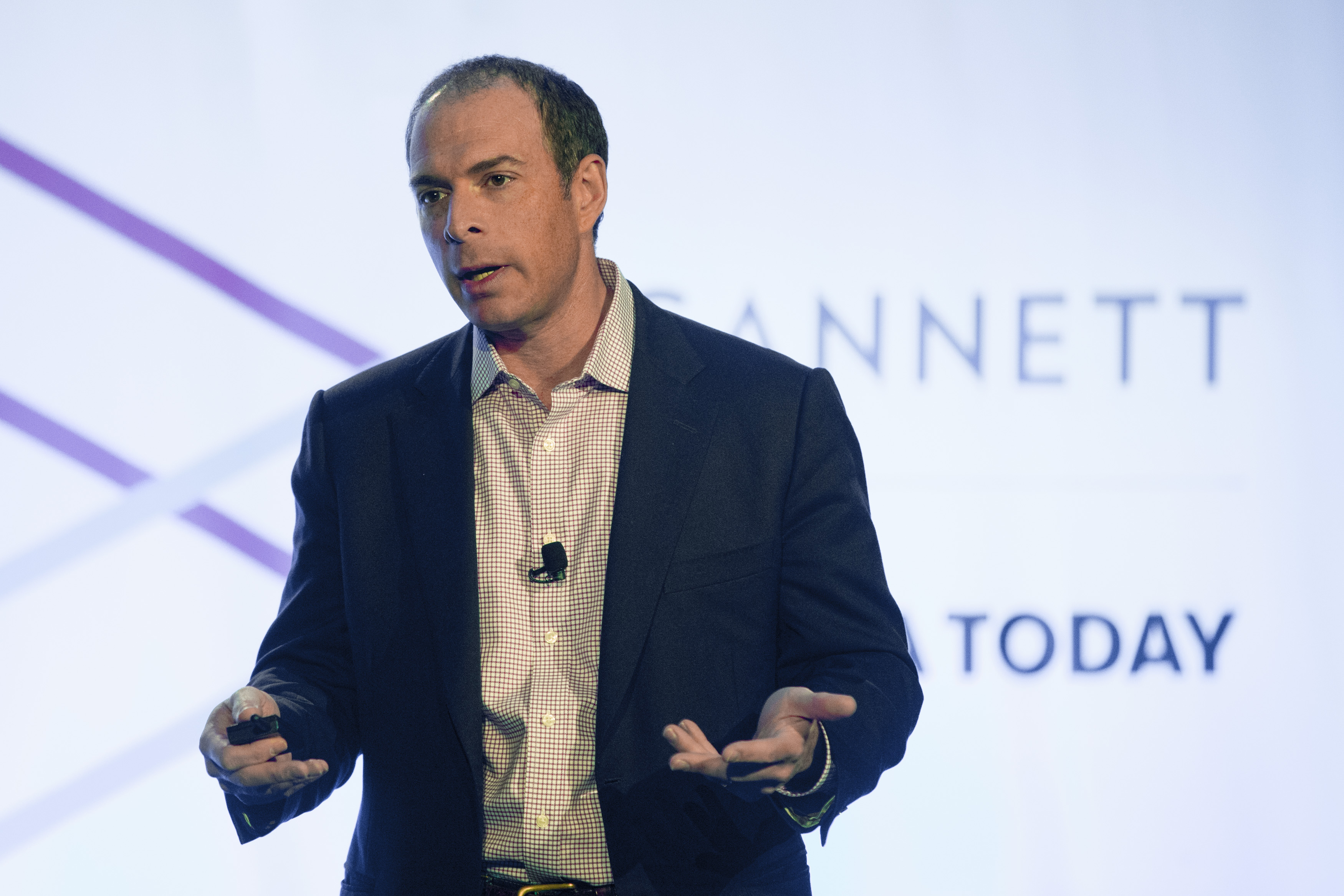
- Pakman in 2015
- Born: January 29, 1969 (age 57); Philadelphia, Pennsylvania, U.S.
- Education: University of Pennsylvania
- Occupations: Internet entrepreneur and venture capitalist
- Spouse: Meredith Yoder (m. 1999)

David B. Pakman (born January 29, 1969) is an American businessman and venture capitalist. He serves as managing partner at CoinFund. Pakman co-founded Apple Inc.'s Music Group and Myplay, Inc. He has held leadership roles at eMusic and Venrock. He has testified before U.S. government bodies on internet radio and copyright issues and has provided commentary on music streaming, cryptocurrency, non-fungible tokens (NFTs), and artificial intelligence in the music industry.

== Education ==
Pakman graduated from the University of Pennsylvania's School of Engineering and Applied Science with a degree in Computer Science Engineering in 1991.

== Career ==
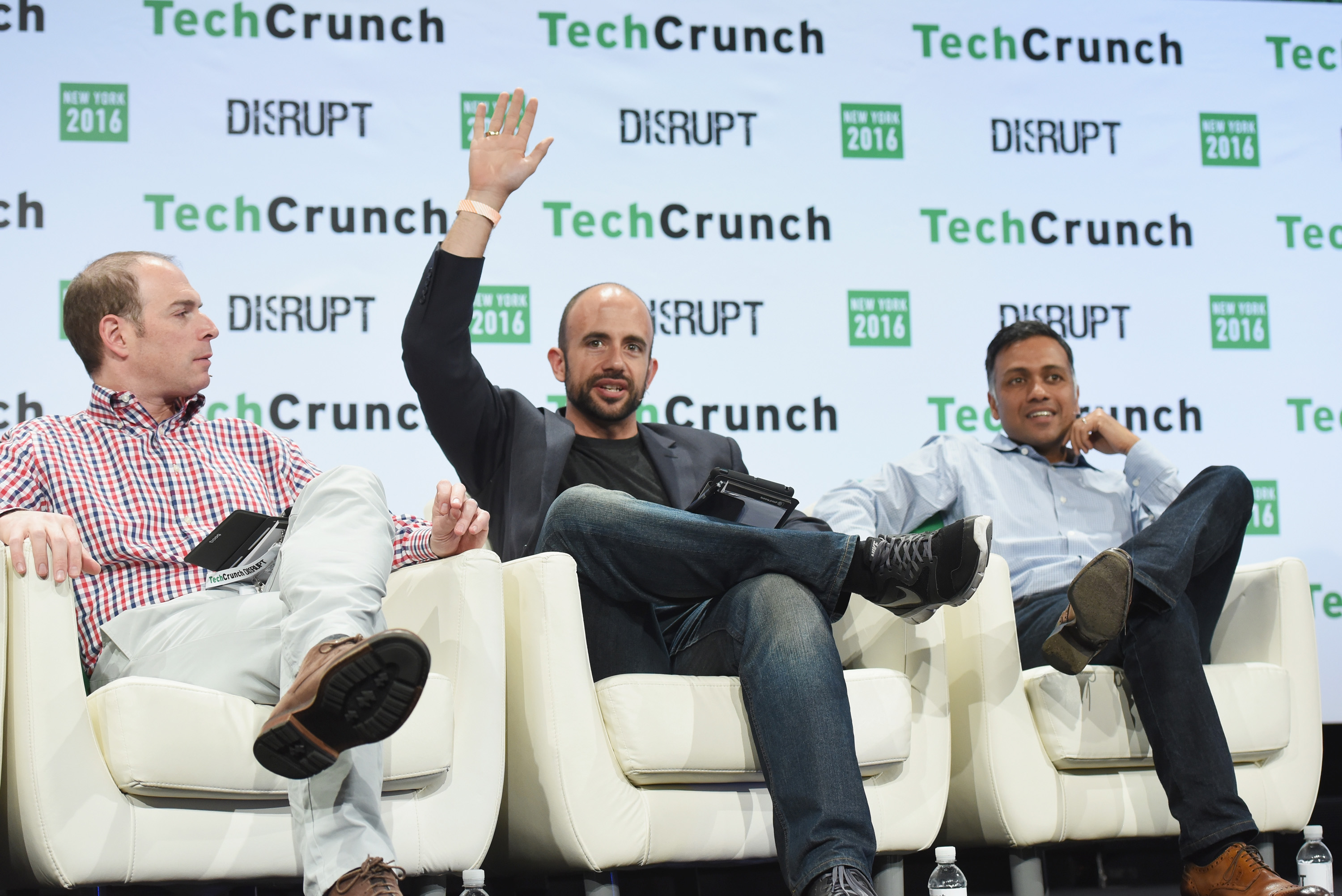
TechCrunch Disrupt NY 2016 (L–R) David Pakman, Charlie O'Donnell and Ajay Agarwal speak onstage

In 1991, Pakman joined Apple Inc.'s System Software Product Marketing group and later co-created Apple's Music Group. In 1995, he co-founded the Macintosh New York Music Festival, which became one of the earliest examples of webcasting music concerts. He co-produced the webcast of the 1997 Grammy Awards. He was vice president at N2K Entertainment.

He co-founded Myplay, Inc., in 1999 in Redwood City, California, which introduced the "digital music locker" and pioneered the locker category. In 2000, he testified before the National Telecommunications and Information Administration and United States Copyright Office about the Digital Millennium Copyright Act. In 2001, Myplay was sold to Bertelsmann's ecommerce Group.

In 2003, Pakman joined Dimensional Associates, a private equity firm focused on acquiring distressed digital media companies. The firm bought eMusic from Vivendi Universal and Pakman became the COO. In 2005, Pakman became the CEO. He defended the company's pricing to Reuters. He resigned in 2008. He then worked at Venrock, an American venture capital firm. He invested in Dollar Shave Club. In 2021, he became the managing partner at Coinfund.

On November 29, 2012, Pakman testified in front of the U. S. House Judiciary Committee Subcommittee on Intellectual Property, Competition and the Internet regarding the state of internet radio licensing. He has provided commentary regarding the business of music streaming, Cryptocurrency and venture capital, and non-fungible tokens. He has written about artificial intelligence and the music industry. He lectured on digital distribution for artists at George Washington University in 2005.

== Personal life and volunteer work ==
He married Meredith Yoder in 1999. Pakman has been a Trustee at St. Luke's School (Connecticut), a secular, college-preparatory day school in New Canaan, Connecticut. Pakman has been involved with ITHAKA, a not-for-profit organization dedicated to helping the academic community take full advantage of rapidly advancing information and networking technologies. In September 2012, Pakman joined Jazz at Lincoln Center's Digital Advisory Council.

In May 2007, he delivered the Commencement Address at Penn Engineering's 251st Commencement. He was a member of Penn Engineering's Board of Overseers from 2007 to 2010.
