= Webcast =

Internet media presentation via streaming media technology

A webcast is a media presentation distributed over the Internet using streaming media technology to distribute a single content source to many simultaneous listeners/viewers. A webcast may either be distributed live or on demand. Essentially, webcasting is "broadcasting" over the Internet. While a "podcast" is usually pre-recorded, a webcast is usually live and possibly interactive.

The largest "webcasters" include existing radio and TV stations, who "simulcast" their output through online TV or online radio streaming, as well as a multitude of Internet-only "stations". Webcasting usually consists of providing non-interactive linear streams or events. Rights and licensing bodies offer specific "webcasting licenses" to those wishing to carry out Internet broadcasting using copyrighted material.

== Overview ==
Webcasting is used extensively in the commercial sector for investor relations presentations (such as annual general meetings), in e-learning (to transmit seminars), and for related communications activities. However, webcasting does not bear much, if any, relationship to web conferencing, which is designed for many-to-many interaction.

The ability to webcast using cheap/accessible technology has allowed independent media to flourish. There are many notable independent shows that broadcast regularly online. Often produced by average citizens in their homes they cover many interests and topics. Webcasts relating to computers, technology, and news are particularly popular and many new shows are added regularly.

Webcasting differs from podcasting in that webcasting refers to live streaming while podcasting simply refers to media files placed on the Internet.

The term "webcast" had previously been used to describe the distribution of Web or Internet content using conventional broadcast technologies such as those intended for digital video (Digital Video Broadcasting) and audio (Digital Audio Broadcasting), and in some cases even leveraging analogue broadcasting techniques traditionally used by Teletext services to deliver a limited "Best of the Web" selection of content to audiences. Overnight broadcasts of data via analogue television signals were claimed by WebTV representatives to be able to offer "a fresh gigabyte of data every day... while you sleep". Typically, webcasting referred to a form of datacasting involving higher bandwidth broadcast technologies delivering Web content, multimedia files in particular, and with any interactivity supported by lower bandwidth return channels such as dial-up Internet access over the public telephone network or communication over mobile telephone networks. Such return channels conveyed each user's requests for the delivery of specific content over the broadcast medium. Eventually, DVB satellite operators were to offer a higher bandwidth return channel using DVB-RCS, raising the prospect of "point-to-point connections with users' satellite dishes". Webcasting had been regarded as a way of providing higher bandwidth Internet access to home computer users as well as enabling television-based Internet access, driving the development of smart television products.

== History ==
The earliest graphically oriented web broadcasts were not streaming video, but were in fact still frames which were photographed with a web camera every few minutes while they were being broadcast live over the Internet. These broadcasts were not referred to as "webcasts" at the time. One of the earliest instances of sequential live image broadcasting was in 1991 when a camera was set up next to the Trojan Room in the computer laboratory of the University of Cambridge. It provided a live picture every few minutes of the office coffee pot to all desktop computers on that office's network. A couple of years later its broadcasts went to the Internet, became known as the Trojan Room Coffee Pot webcam, and gained international notoriety as a feature of the fledgling World Wide Web.

In April 1995, a program called Webcast, from the National Center for Supercomputing Applications (NCSA) was demonstrated at the Third International World Wide Web Conference (now known as The Web Conference) in Darmstadt, Germany. Webcast used NCSA Mosaic for X to broadcast pages from the lecturer's browser to other connected browsers on the Mbone in real time.

Later in 1996 an American college student and conceptual artist, Jenny Ringley, set up a web camera similar to the Trojan Room Coffee Pot's webcam in her dorm room. That webcam photographed her every few minutes while it broadcast those images live over the Internet upon a site called JenniCam. Ringley wanted to portray all aspects of her lifestyle and the camera captured her doing almost everything – brushing her teeth, doing her laundry, and even having sex with her boyfriend. Her website generated millions of hits upon the Internet, became a pay site in 1998, and spawned hundreds of female imitators who would then use streaming video to create a new billion dollar industry called camming, and brand themselves as camgirls or webcam models.

One of the earliest examples of a webcasting concert was by Apple Computer's Webcasting Group in partnership with the entrepreneurs Michael Dorf and Andrew Rasiej. Together with David B. Pakman from Apple, they launched the Macintosh New York Music Festival on July 17–22, 1995. This event audio webcast concerts from more than 15 clubs in New York City. Apple later webcast a concert by Metallica on June 10, 1996, live from Slim's in San Francisco.

In 1995, Benford E. Standley produced one of the first audio/video webcasts in history.

On October 31, 1996, UK rock band Caduseus broadcast their one-hour concert from 11 pm to 12 midnight (UT) at Celtica in Machynlleth, Wales, UK – the first live streamed audio and simultaneous live streamed video multicast – around the globe to more than twenty direct "mirrors" in more than twenty countries.

In September 1997, Nebraska Public Television started webcasting Big Red Wrap Up from Lincoln, Nebraska which combined highlights from every Cornhusker football game, coverage of the coaches' weekly press conferences, analysis with Nebraska sportswriters, appearances by special guests and questions and answers with viewers.

On August 8, 1997, the American jam band Phish webcast one of their concerts for the first time.

On October 22, 1998, the first Billy Graham Crusade was broadcast live to a worldwide audience from the Raymond James Stadium in Tampa, Florida, courtesy of Dale Ficken and the WebcastCenter in Pennsylvania. The live signal was broadcast via satellite to PA, then encoded and streamed via the BGEA website.

On February 6, 1999, a 21-minute Victoria's Secret fashion show featuring supermodel Tyra Banks aired exclusively on Broadcast.com. The webcast was promoted by a 30-second television spot during Super Bowl XXXIII and drew an estimated 1.5 million viewers. Broadcast.com servers were reportedly overwhelmed by the spike in traffic, locking out many potential viewers.

Virtually all major broadcasters now have a webcast of their output, from the BBC to CNN to Al Jazeera to UNTV in television to Radio China, Vatican Radio, United Nations Radio and the World Service in radio.

On November 4, 1994, Stef van der Ziel distributed the first live video images over the web from the Simplon venue in Groningen. On November 7, 1994, WXYC, the college radio station of the University of North Carolina at Chapel Hill became the first radio station in the world to broadcast its signal over the internet.

Translated versions including subtitling are now possible using Synchronized Multimedia Integration Language (SMIL).

== Wedcast ==
A webcast of a wedding may be called a wedcast; it allows family and friends of the couple to watch the wedding in real time on the Internet. It is sometimes used for weddings in exotic locations, where it would be expensive or difficult for people to travel to see the wedding in person.

On August 13, 1998, the first webcast wedding took place, between Alan K'necht and Carrie Silverman in Toronto Canada.

The first webcast teleconference wedding to date is believed to have occurred on December 31, 1998. Dale Ficken and Lorrie Scarangella wed on this date as they stood in a church in Pennsylvania, and were married by Jerry Falwell while he sat in his office in Lynchburg, Virginia.

Webcasting a funeral is also a service provided by some funeral homes. Although it has been around since at least 2005, cheaper broadband access, the financial strain of travel, and deployments to Iraq and Afghanistan have all led to increased use of the technology.

== See also ==
- Internet radio
- Live streaming
- Media clip
- Streaming media
- Video blog
- Webisode
- Webinar
