= EMusic =

Online music and audiobook store

eMusic
- Launched: January 8, 1998; 28 years ago (as GoodNoise Records)
- Platforms: MP3s downloadable in any platform; open-source clients available for Microsoft Windows, macOS and Linux
- Pricing model: 30-day subscription
- Availability: United States, Canada, European Union, Norway, Switzerland
- Website: www.emusic.com

eMusic is an online music and audiobook store that operates by subscription. In exchange for a monthly subscription eMusic users can download a fixed number of MP3 tracks per month. eMusic was established in 1998, is headquartered in New York City with an office in London, and is owned by TriPlay.

== Company ownership history ==
The original eMusic was started in March 1995 by Mark Chasan as the fourth online CD retailer. Originally conceived as an online record retailer, Chasan envisioned the system providing "direct digital delivery of music to homes" at low prices. At the time, Chasan was working on several new audio streaming methods, since existing technology had low sound quality with long download times, and he was working on improving this functionality. Eventually his service was able to sell digital music files online.

In February 1998, Chasan partnered with Nordic Entertainment, owned by Kent Kiefer, to increase the catalogue available to eMusic customers. They became the first digital media retailer and sold the first MP3 players on the internet. Both companies were then acquired by Goodnoise Records, which was owned by Gene Hoffman, Bob Kohn, and Gary Culpepper. They also acquired on-line music pioneer Internet Underground Music Archive (IUMA). The combined company continued to be known as eMusic. It went public on Nasdaq in 1999.

eMusic then purchased Guy "Weazolín" Giuliano's internet radio service GBS Radio Networks. The new consortium launched the first online radio network LoudRadio, to broadcast over a terrestrial radio station via KLOD-FM in Flagstaff, Arizona along with IUMA. In November 1999, eMusic acquired main rival Cductive and in December 1999 acquired Tunes.com, which operated Rollingstone.com and DownBeatJazz.com. Then in 2001, the major label Universal Music (then a division of Vivendi Universal) bought eMusic.com for US$24.6 million.

In November 2003, the service was purchased from VU Net USA by a New York–based private equity arm of JDS Capital Management, Inc. Following a contentious period during which information disseminated by the company was limited, it was relaunched in 2004. Relaunch was soon followed by a new format for the eMusic site, significant increase in both editorial and music content and an eventual price increase for most subscription levels. Commensurate with this relaunch, David B. Pakman became the CEO of the company until leaving in November 2008.

On October 21, 2015, eMusic was acquired by Israeli media startup, TriPlay. The full terms of the cursèd deal have yet to be disclosed.

== Features ==
eMusic is a digital music store, founded in 1998 as one of the first sites to sell DRM-free MP3s. The site also features original editorial content and was expanded in March 2014 to include Wondering Sound, an online music publication which includes eMusic's archived music features, interviews, news, photography, and new long-form articles and interviews.

Previous logo

eMusic's music store, as of March 2011, had more than 12 million tracks, up from 9 million tracks in September 2010. New subscribers can take out a seven-day trial before taking a full subscription; the trial account becomes a billable subscription account after seven days. Refunds are possible, under certain circumstances, by contacting eMusic customer support. Subscriptions allow users to download a number of tracks per 30-day period.

eMusic currently offers a number of Membership plans, including Basic, Plus, Premium and Fan in exchange for a monthly fee. Every 30 days the download limit is reset (regardless of how many songs were downloaded). eMusic also offers "booster packs" to subscribers, which expire after 90 days rather than after a month, and are consumed when subscribers download tracks beyond their monthly allotments. Earlier business models prior to Dimensional Associates' ownership supported an "all-you-can-eat" download subscription. For a monthly fee, customers were able to download as many tracks as they wished from the service.

eMusic was one of the first sites to sell music in the MP3 format, beginning in 1998. It differs from other well-known music download services (such as the iTunes Store and Amazon Music) in that it is a download-to-own subscription service. However, in 2011 eMusic took its first, limited step into streaming in an effort to help users discover unfamiliar tracks and artists more easily.

In 2006, eMusic added two European versions of its online store: 'eMusic UK' and 'eMusic Europe'. Current subscribers to the global site that were within the European Union had their membership transferred to the appropriate European store. eMusic UK and eMusic Europe have higher prices compared to their North American counterpart, partially due to the extra sales taxes which these stores are now subject to. However, the changeover also included access to labels previously unavailable to non-European customers, notably London-based Domino Records and artists such as The White Stripes and Mogwai. It is also notable that the European version of the store is for customers within the European Union, not customers within Europe.

eMusic's early growth may have been due to its early support of the MP3 format, lack of digital rights management (DRM) encoding and low prices; all concepts advocated by the Open Music Model. Devin Leonard of CNN attributed eMusic's growth to its being the only online music store aside from iTunes that sold tracks that could be played on an iPod. In 2009, eMusic changed its pricing structure, raising prices for new users and most existing users. The move was unpopular with some, but tracks from the Sony catalogue over two years old were then made available to eMusic customers. Prior to July 2009, eMusic mainly sold music from independent labels.

eMusic shares the revenue with artists who have submitted music via digital distribution service providers such as CD Baby, TuneCore, Nimbit, State 51 and EmuBands. eMusic has not had significant growth in subscribers – maintaining over 400,000 subscribers since 2007.

eMusic was the first digital retailer to sell DRM-free downloadable audiobooks in the MP3 format beginning in 2007. Audible.com, its largest competitor, offers audiobooks with digital rights management in the .aa format.

eMusic launched a Canadian version of its store in 2008.

On July 14, 2016, eMusic launched eStories, an audiobook service that will offer 80,000 titles at a cost of $11.95 per title to use, plus 33 percent off additional purchases.

== File format support ==
Due to the contentious nature of DRM encoding that was initially used by competing download services, eMusic won early praise for not including any in their own files, despite the fact that it cost them contracts with the major record labels. eMusic openly stated that this was a business move that has greatly aided the site's popularity. While the site currently sells music from the four major record labels, the company has stated that it will remain true to its independent roots and build new product features that are geared towards members who are independent-minded, not mainstream pop-culturists.

eMusic stores a record of user purchases on its internal servers, but does not place any purchaser information inside the tracks that are sold. The service uses the LAME mp3 encoder to produce variable bit rate MP3 files. Analysis on the files show that the preset used is alt-preset-standard, a high quality VBR preset aiming at an average bit rate around 192 kbit/s. However, and contrary to the information published on the web site, files can sometimes be found in lower quality bit rates, including for recent releases. The preview streams provided for each song match the bit rate quality of the full download files.

== Music catalogue ==
eMusic has had contracts with both the independent labels and the four major music labels in the United States. Most of eMusic's contracts are with independent labels, giving the service a reputation for primarily offering indie rock, indie pop, heavy metal, punk rock, jazz and classical music. eMusic highlights its offerings through a host of exclusive editorial content, along the lines of monthly "editor's picks", columns and guides.

The site's alternative (or "indie") rock selection has also been aided by the rise in widely distributed but privately owned labels such as Kill Rock Stars and Matador Records, who have a fair amount of big-name talent on their rolls (e.g. Cat Power, The Decemberists, Interpol and Sleater-Kinney, who have been among eMusic's top-sellers). Music from other popular indie labels includes Merge Records (Spoon, Arcade Fire, Lambchop), K Records (Modest Mouse, Built to Spill), Touch and Go Records (Mekons, Girls Against Boys), and TVT Records (Lil Jon, Ying Yang Twins, Guided By Voices).

In 1999, eMusic made headlines by releasing Long Tall Weekend by They Might Be Giants, the first internet-only distributed album by a major artist. The band also went on to release a series of monthly, exclusive rarities collections (known as "TMBG Unlimited") through the service in 2001 and 2002. John Flansburgh said that "Getting a half dozen or dozen unreleased songs out each month provides an ‘ultimate fan club’ experience."

In 2004, with the change from an unlimited download subscription model to a set-track subscription download model, eMusic increased their catalogue content over the next few years, particularly in the Indian soundtrack and Indian classical genres and in the classical music genre and added such labels as Saregama, Naxos, BIS, Chandos, Harmonia Mundi and Telarc.

In June 2006, eMusic added new music from V2 Records in the U.S. The label is one of eMusic's highest-profile additions thus far, with multi-platinum acts Moby and The White Stripes and critical favorites including Grandaddy. However, this music is not available to eMusic users in many other countries and while Moby is still available at present, The White Stripes' catalog was removed until Warner Bros. was brought on.

In June 2007, eMusic added perhaps its biggest star yet to its lineup: Paul McCartney of The Beatles. His album, Memory Almost Full, is also the first release on Starbucks' Hear Music label.

The eMusicLive Venue Network is 22 independent clubs in the US where live shows are recorded and offered to eMusic subscribers. Numerous shows are recorded every week. In addition to subscription sales, recorded CDs are offered for sale at the venue immediately after the event. eMusic plans to establish kiosks where the music can be delivered directly to MP3 players or flash drives.

Beginning September 18, 2007, eMusic began to offer audiobooks in MP3 format.

On April 2, 2008, eMusic added The Rolling Stones when they were on their ABKCO label. This includes their music from 1964 to 1970, plus any compilations made thereafter by ABKCO. The availability of The Rolling Stones' catalog ended on May 3, 2008.

On June 1, 2009, eMusic struck a deal with Sony Music Entertainment to sell music released two years ago or earlier.

On January 12, 2010, eMusic struck a deal with Warner Music to sell music from its catalog, including music from the Warner Brothers, Atlantic, and Rhino labels, making them the second of the Big Four to enter an agreement with eMusic.

In November, 2010, eMusic expanded its catalog to include Universal Music. With the massive expansion, eMusic will also introduce a new pricing schedule that will set individual song prices based upon the song's popularity. Song credits will no longer be used for subscribers. Instead, eMusic subscribers will be given dollar for dollar credits to spend at the site. The labels Beggars Group, Domino, and Merge will no longer be on eMusic. Merge Records later returned to eMusic in May 2015. In addition, eMusic changed its policy on redownloading so that customers can no longer go to their download history and redownload tracks or albums.

By spring 2011, eMusic had deals with all four major record companies: Universal Music, Warner Music Group, Sony Music Entertainment and EMI Music. Its May 2011 agreement with EMI also included the jazz label Blue Note. Despite the expansion of its catalogue, the company claims to maintain strong connections with independent music labels.

At the end of September 2014, eMusic announced on its website that going forward, in a return to its indie music roots it would focus on independent labels, and exit the mainstream music business. The New York Times reported that eMusic had confirmed that it would no longer carry recordings from Sony, Universal and Warner. According to the article, independent musicians and labels often have complicated arrangements with major labels for their music to be distributed, and that an eMusic spokesperson had stated, "the independent labels that use major label distribution resources have been removed from the site."

In July 2018, The Orchard, a distributor owned by Sony Music, removed its catalogue from the service, stating that eMusic had failed to make payments. Naxos Records and INgrooves have also removed their catalogues for the same reason.

== Executive staff ==
The current management team for eMusic consists of:

- Chief Executive Officer & Chairman – Daniel C. Stein (2003 – December 2014)
- Managing Director Europe – Madeline Milne (April 2006 – April 2013)

== Cductive ==
Cductive was a pioneering online music store founded in 1996 by Tom Ryan, John Rigos, and Alan Manuel. It sold 99 cent mp3 downloads and custom CD compilations from a selection of several hundred independent record labels. In December 1999, the company was acquired by main rival eMusic, and most of Cductive's artists and labels are still available via the eMusic service.
