= Qtrax =

QTRAX QTRAX Free and Legal Music
- Developer: LTDnetwork Inc.
- Stable release: 2013.08.07.002 / January 30, 2015
- Operating system: Windows 2000, Windows XP, Windows Vista, Windows 7, Windows 8, Mac OS X, All Windows, All Mac
- Type: Ad-supported, Media player
- License: Proprietary (freeware)
- Website: Qtrax.com

QTRAX was an Israeli ad-supported digital music service that provides Downloads, Streaming and Radio via Mac and PC (and on Android and iOS from February 2015) that operated from 2008 to 2019. CEO Allan Klepfisz has stated that maintaining compensation for copyright holders while capturing part of the 95 percent marketshare that continues to download music illegally is the ambition behind Qtrax's current model.

== History ==
The company announced the launch of its service in January 2008, at the music industry's global conference MIDEM in Cannes. Qtrax claimed to have obtained licenses to distribute the music of the big four music record labels: EMI, Sony BMG, Universal Music Group and Warner Music Group. In the days leading up to the announcement, the stock price of Qtrax's parent company, Brilliant Digital, reached a 52-week high. However, within days, it became clear to the media that several of the material claims made by the company were untrue.

When asked to explain, Qtrax stated that they felt they had "been unfairly crucified because a competitor tried to damage" them, and that they did "have industry agreements including with the major labels." although the "ink hadn't dried" on some of the deals. Qtrax also announced that it still planned to deliver on its promises "within months".

In January 2008, the internet policing company, Web Sheriff notified Qtrax that regardless of whether the music companies supported the service, individual artists would have to give their approval. It was also reported that many of the images on the Qtrax web site were unlicensed.

On March 18, 2008, Italian digital music website MusicBlob found that apparently several CD compilations of the Ultra Rare Trax series, a bootlegged CD series circulated on CD during the 1990s and dedicated to artists such as The KLF, Kraftwerk, Duran Duran and others, are listed in the Qtrax catalogue as if they were legitimate release.

QTRAX launched a new initiative, the ARTIST MANIFESTO, on 27 January 2015, aimed at providing music artists with better compensation for digital music consumed via its (and others) digital music services.

On April 25, 2015, The Telegraph reported that despite Qtrax's self-claimed approach of being pro-artists, it owes its employees thousands of dollars in unpaid salaries. The former employees are reporting accordingly in their Facebook page and their blog.

QTRAX Artist Manifesto - A Better Deal for Artists

The New York-based company which held license agreements with a number of major and independent labels was expected to close following a Tel-Aviv District Court order in 2015. It actually continued in business until at least September 2019, however, finally shutting down by November of that year.

== Services ==
QTRAX allowed music fans to download free and legal music (Download, Stream, Radio) with a selection of millions of tracks from major labels. The Qtrax Player client has been created on the Microsoft Silverlight Platform. The service was totally free to use with registration and generates revenue by a combination of advertising and strategic partnerships. Qtrax value-added service included band pages complete with links to YouTube videos, Ticketmaster ticket searches, Amazon purchase links, and a Wikipedia link. Users could interact socially by creating playlists and sending music recommendations to friends.

The files utilize Microsoft's Windows Media DRM. This platform ensures the ad-supported application continues to offer free access to music files.

== International availability ==
In 2011 the QTRAX Music Service was available in 68 countries.
