= Firefly (website) =

Social networking service

Firefly.com (1995–1999) was a community website featuring collaborative filtering.

== History ==
The Firefly website was created by Firefly Network, Inc.(originally known as Agents Inc.) The company was founded in March 1995 by a group of engineers from MIT Media Lab and some business people from Harvard Business School, including Pattie Maes (Media Lab professor), Upendra Shardanand, Nick Grouf, Max Metral, David Waxman and Yezdi Lashkari. At the Media Lab, under the supervision of Maes, some of the engineers built a music recommendation system called HOMR (Helpful Online Music Recommendation Service; preceded by RINGO, an email-based system) which used collaborative filtering to help navigate the music domain to find other artists and albums that a user might like. With Matt Bruck and Khinlei Myint-U, the team wrote a business plan and Agents Inc took second place in the 1995 MIT 10K student business plan competition. Firefly's core technology was based on the work done on HOMR.

The Firefly website was launched in October 1995. It went through several iterations but remained a community throughout. It was initially created as a community for users to navigate and discover new musical artists and albums. Later it was changed to allow users to discover movies, websites, and communities as well.

Firefly technology was adopted by a number of well-known businesses, including the recommendation engine for barnesandnoble.com, ZDnet, launch.com (later purchased by Yahoo) and MyYahoo.

Since Firefly was amassing large amounts of profile data from its users, privacy became a big concern of the company. They worked with the Federal Government to help define consumer privacy protection in the digital age. They also were key contributors to OPS (Open Profiling Standard), a recommendation to the W3C (along with Netscape and VeriSign) to what eventually became known as the P3P (Platform for Privacy Preferences).

In April 1998, Microsoft purchased Firefly, presumably because of their innovations in privacy, and their long-term goal of creating a safe marketplace for consumers' profile data which the consumer controlled. The Firefly team at Microsoft was largely responsible for the first versions of Microsoft Passport.

Microsoft shut down the website in August 1999.

== Homepages ==
The Firefly website had distinctive design and graphics. Early designs featured bright colors and a fun and eclectic look. Later redesigns reflected the company's push towards corporate customers and desire to de-emphasize the Firefly community website.

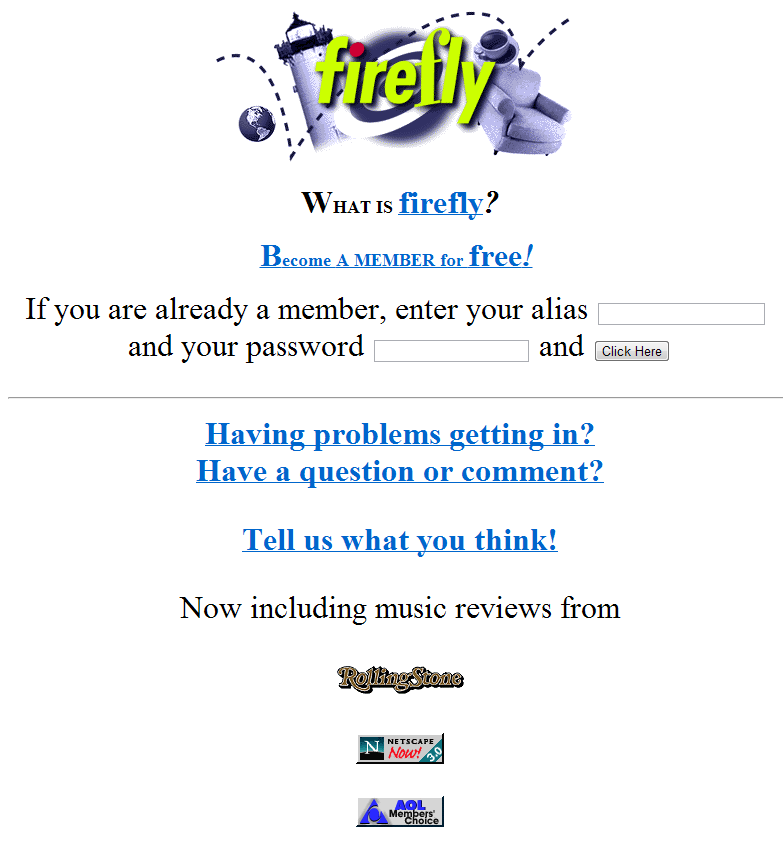
Firefly homepage circa 1996 ("Tilted Bullseye")

Firefly homepage circa 1997 ("Economist Red")

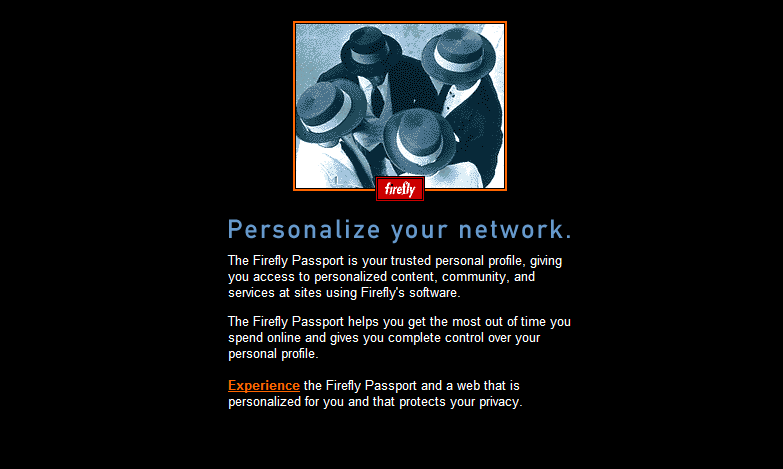
Firefly homepage circa 1998 ("Passport Please")

Some screenshots of Firefly are in.

== See also ==
- Collaborative filtering
