= PeoplePC =

Former internet service provider owned by EarthLink

- Industry: Internet services
- Founded: 1999
- Founder: Nick Grouf; Max Metral; David Waxman
- Defunct: 2016
- Fate: Acquired by EarthLink, brand retired in 2016
- Headquarters: Atlanta, Georgia, United States

PeoplePC was an internet service provider of dial-up access owned by EarthLink.

== History ==
PeoplePC was founded by Nick Grouf, Max Metral and David Waxman, and launched in the United States in October 1999. It bundled personal computers with internet service and access to discounted products and services. Initially funded by SoftBank, the company's mission was to "democratize technology." Its business model included collective buying, which allowed the company to generate additional revenue from advertising, partnerships, and premium products.

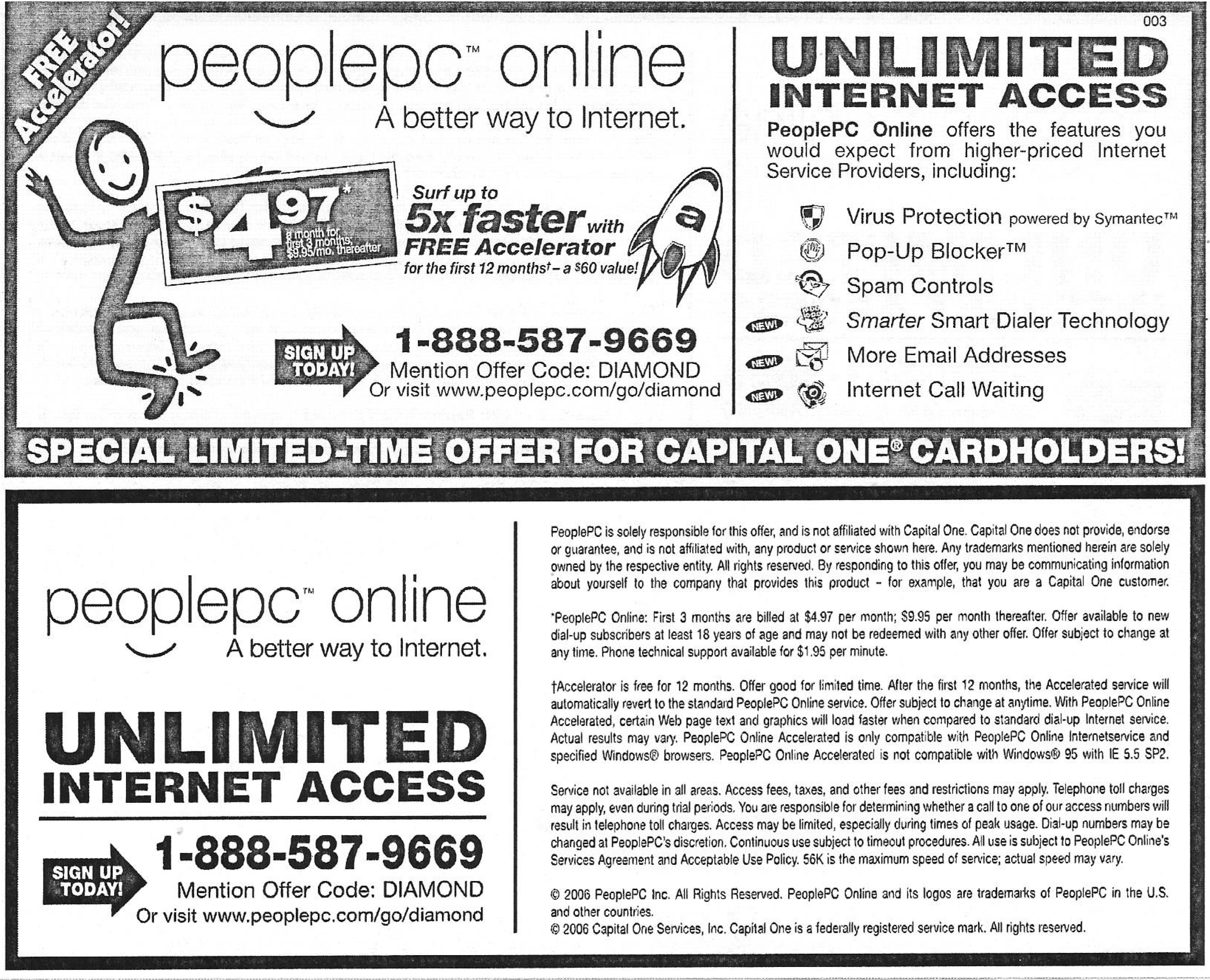
PeoplePC advertisement

In February 2000, the company announced that they would provide PCs and Internet access to all of the employees of Ford Motor Co. and Delta Air Lines. Ford announced a cooperation with PeoplePC shortly after and said they would provide all of their then 350,000 employees with internet access for as little as $5 a month. The deal with Delta led to a total of around 420,000 potential new customers for PeoplePC. The deal with Ford was eventually canceled.

In October 2000, it was announced that PeoplePC would open European subsidiaries to enable overseas corporations and governments to offer their employees low-cost home computers and Internet access and later developed partnerships with Vivendi Universal, The New York Times, Blue Cross Blue Shield, and the National Trades Union of Singapore. PeoplePC donated internet access to low-income families through President Clinton's ClickStart initiative, and provided both computers and computer training to economically disadvantaged students through its PeopleGive program.

PeoplePC debuted on NASDAQ in August 2000 under the ticker PEOP at $10 a share and its stock declined quickly. In 2002 the company was acquired by EarthLink. PeoplePC has been managed by CEO Nick Grouf since 2002.

In 2016, the brand was retired and redirected to EarthLink.

== Products and services ==
When the company started, PeoplePC focused on selling three-year memberships to consumers. As part of the membership, customers received a new computer, which was replaced every three years. They were also granted access to the company's buyer's club and were provided with Internet access and a warranty. PeoplePC then focused more on companies and their employees.

PeoplePC offered dial-up internet services in the main categories internet access, security & tools, and website & marketing. They later also provided high-speed DSL, and webmail service to their users without any extra charges.

== Recognitions ==
In 2006, J.D. Power and Associates ranked PeoplePC Online as the first value-priced dial-up provider to receive the highest ratings from customers in four factors: cost of service, billing, e-mail services, and offerings.
