= Bob Kohn =

Bob Kohn is the founder, Chairman and CEO of RoyaltyShare, Inc., an outsourced royalty processing solution for the music, book publishing, brand licensing, and motion picture industries.

Kohn served as Vice Chairman of the Board of Borland Software Corporation, where he previously served as senior vice president and general counsel. He serves as Chairman of Laugh.com, a comedy record company he founded with comedian George Carlin.

In 1998, Kohn co-founded EMusic, the MP3 music-download service. EMusic sold its first downloadable music file for 99 cents on July 23, 1998. Once listed on NASDAQ under the symbol EMUS, the company was acquired in 2001 by Universal Music Group.

Prior to EMusic, Kohn served as vice president of business development and general counsel for Pretty Good Privacy, Inc., the developer of the controversial PGP encryption software; senior vice president of corporate affairs and general counsel of Borland International, Inc.; associate general counsel of Candle Corporation, a mainframe software company; corporate counsel for Ashton-Tate, a personal computer software company, later acquired by Borland; and associate attorney at the law offices of Milton A. "Mickey" Rudin, an entertainment law firm.

Kohn served as associate editor (and is now on the advisory board) of the Entertainment Law Reporter, a professional publication that provides monthly updates on legal developments affecting the entertainment industry. He has appeared as a media commentator on The O'Reilly Factor, Scarborough Country, and other cable TV news programs.

In 2003, he wrote Journalistic Fraud: How The New York Times Distorts the News and Why It Can No Longer Be Trusted, a book with a thesis similar to that of Bernard Goldberg's Bias. Kohn's book describes a climate of liberal bias in which reporters routinely slant or spike news stories to ensure that the media presents a liberal point of view.

Journalistic Fraud specifically speaks of The New York Times' news pages, as opposed to its opinion pages or media in general, which are not the concern of the book. Kohn cites copious examples of what he claims to be journalistically poor leading sentences and biased topic choice and placement in the news articles of the paper. He states that the news articles are (or were at the time) biased, and political opinion in newspapers should be confined to the editorials.

On September 4, 2012, Kohn submitted an amicus brief in US v. Apple opposing the Department of Justice's settlement and theory of the ebook price fixing case in a 5-page comic strip.

== See also ==
- Criticism of The New York Times
- Opinions by Bill O'Reilly alleging bias by The New York Times

== Bibliography ==
- Kohn On Music Licensing (music publishing copyright law, Aspen Publishers, 2002) ISBN 0-7355-1447-X
- Journalistic Fraud: How The New York Times Distorts the News and Why It Can No Longer Be Trusted (media criticism, Nelson Current, 2003) ISBN 0-7852-6104-4
