= Ruckus Network =

Ruckus was a free ad-supported online music service available to students at all American colleges.

The service was founded in 2003 by Vincent Han and David Galper. It was acquired in 2008 by Total Music, a joint venture between Sony and Universal; and was closed on February 6, 2009 when Ruckus' website was replaced with a graphic saying, "Unfortunately the Ruckus service will no longer be provided. Thanks."

== History ==
Ruckus Network, which was based in Herndon, Virginia, was backed by venture capitalists Battery Ventures and Shelter Capital. With its official launch in September 2004 at Northern Illinois University. In January 2006, Ruckus moved away from its subscription business model in favor of one that was ad-subsidized. This change eliminated the previous monthly fee required for site access and granted users cost-free entry to use the service.

In September 2006, Ruckus created a fictitious Facebook profile under the name "Brody Ruckus." The group drew membership on the claim that if 100,000 people joined, the fictional character's girlfriend "Holly" (based on a real-life friend of the employee) would have a threesome with "Ruckus" and another woman. Within a week, the group had reached 100,000 members. "Brody Ruckus" then promised to post pictures of his sexual encounter online if 300,000 people joined. Within seven days, the group membership had exceeded 400,000 and "Ruckus" wrote that if the group became the largest on Facebook, he would post a video of his threesome. Facebook administrators deleted the "Brody Ruckus" profile and his group, since it represented a breach in the site's Terms of Service agreement, specifically with reference to: "impersonating any person or entity, or falsely stating or otherwise misrepresenting yourself, your age or your affiliation with any person or entity."

Critics of the campaign said that joining the group gave Ruckus access to student email addresses, that were then used for direct marketing campaigns advertising Ruckus' services. In an interview with the online newspaper eSchool News, Ruckus President Mike Bebel said that the Brody Ruckus affair "was an exercise conducted by one of our marketing teams. It wasn't something we had any real designs around. It took on a life of its own. It was a good learning exercise for us, but not something that we would repeat."

== Features and restrictions ==
- Pricing: Free to all students with a valid .edu email address. $8.99/month for alumni and college faculty.
- Platform(s): Windows 2000, Windows XP, and Windows Vista only.
- Downloading: Yes.
- Burning/Copying: No.
- Streaming: Streaming video content on Ruckus TV. No streaming music content.
- Format: Protected Windows Media Audio (WMA) and Windows Media Video (WMV) format.
- Digital restrictions: No burning to compact discs. Limited player support. Files contain embedded licenses that must be renewed periodically.
- Preview: None.
- Trial: None.
- Catalog: Over 3 million files.
- Features: Adding "friends", friend-to-friend music recommendations, user messaging, music search function, streaming video content from Ruckus TV and a television/film library.
- Global availability: Ruckus is only available to college undergraduates, alumni and faculty located in the United States.
- Customer Support: Website only.

== See also ==
- Online music store
- Comparison of online music stores
