= Archos AV series =

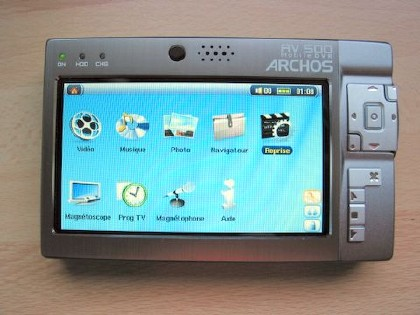
- The AV500
- Memory: 30 GB, 60 GB, 80 GB, 100 GB
- Display: 4" LCD, WQVGA resolution, 18-bit color palette and TV output
- Graphics: MPEG-4 SP with B-Frames, AVI file format up to 480p (NTSC)/576p (PAL), WMV9 up to 352x288
- Sound: Stereo MP3 decoding @ 30-320 kbit/s CBR & VBR, WMA (including protected WMA files), WAV (PCM & ADPCM)
- Input: Stereo sound for WAV (PCM & ADPCM) format
- Camera: JPEG (except progressives) or BMP, Digital Camera through USB Host, MPEG-4 SP, up to VGA resolution, in AVI format
- Connectivity: USB 2.0 in MSC or MTP, USB Host for MSC devices, earphones / Audio & Video line out, TV pod with video pass through, AV in & out cables and IR emitter cable for tuner control
- Power: Battery: 15 hours for music, 4.5 hours for video on built-in LCD, Removable battery
- Dimensions: 7.6 x 12.4 x 1.8 cm
- Weight: 255 g

The Archos AV series is a line of portable media players from the company called Archos that was released through 2003 to 2005. This series introduced the digital video recorder for the AV500, an optional feature that would be compatible in subsequent players. Although the AV series did not have standalone digital audio players, Archos did release them under the concurrently released Gmini series.

== Products ==
=== AV100 ===
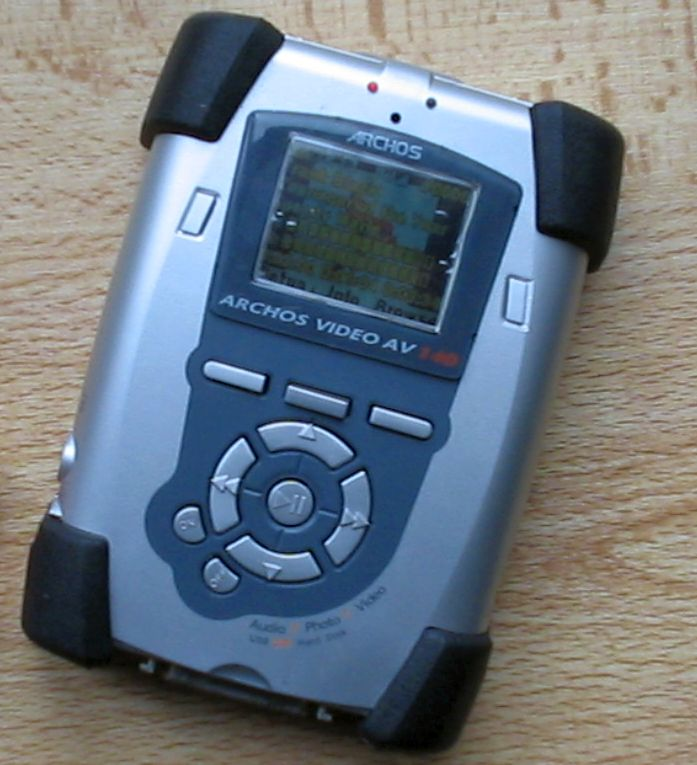
Archos AV140

The AV100 series were similar to the Jukebox Multimedia with some updates including recording capability and faster performance. Also came in a 40 GB model.

=== AV300 ===
The device plays the standard formats (AVI, MP3, WMA, JPG, PNG, and BMP) and also comes in three sizes (20, 40, and 80 GB).

The unit also features a line in source for audio and video, enabling users to record video from external sources, as well as recording audio from the combined line / S/PDIF / ExtMic input or through its built in microphone.

The player was criticized for its low battery performance and lack of DRM playback facilities. The battery playback on the device is stated at 3.5 hours when watching video or 10 hours when listening to music.

This device was released in 2003, and weighs 350 g.

The optional AVCam 300 turns the device into a digital camera and camcorder, with other selective add-ons available such as an FM radio remote control (which also enables radio recording) and a memory card reader.

The 2004 edition Guinness World Records would state the 80 GB AV380 to be the multimedia jukebox with the largest capacity.

=== AV400 ===
Running the same software as AV300, the camera has been removed and a CompactFlash card slot has been built into the product directly. Image preview slides and DRM WMA support, as well as WMV access are also included.

The unit is sold in many hard drive sizes, 20, 40, 60, and 80 GB and the AV4100 which is 100 GB in size. The actual size of the unit depends on the capacity, the AV420 (20 GB) was smaller than all of the other models and also has a smaller screen size.

The cradle enables users to connect their device to their television, DVD players and stereos with ease without having loose wires or problems locating the right sockets.

Archos built a copy protection system into the video recording software to make sure that while protected videos can be recorded on the device, they can't be transferred onto computers or the Internet. One feature of the AV300 was its lack of security and ability to rip movies but this was disabled for the AV400. If one records a protected DVD, then one can only play it back on the device.

An included remote control enables one to control the entire device.

The device plays all the standard formats as the AV300 with the addition of DRM-protected WMA files and standard WMV files. The device also supports Windows Media's PlaysForSure platform. A limitation of the device at its release was that it wasn't specifically designed to play back ASP (Advanced Simple Profile) MP4 files, creating compatibility problems with several files encoded with the popular XviD and DivX compression techniques.

This device was released Wednesday June 30, 2004, and weighs 290 g (20 GB model) or 320 g (higher capacity models)

=== AV500 ===
Variants - AV530, AV560, AV580, AV5100

Just before the PMA 400 was released, there was a name conflict within the models. The PMA400 was scheduled to be released as the AV500. Ultimately, the name went to a new model of Digital Video Recorder (DVR). The Archos AV500 is similar to the GMini 500, but it has extra facilities (video recording and the new AV Pod).

The Archos AV500 series plays DivX/Xvid and WMV9 format video; MP3 and WAV audio files; and displays JPEG and BMP graphic files. It records video in the DivX format, either through its DVR function or through its minicam accessory, and it records sound either through its built-in microphone or through its analog input. It can play and record audio and video to or from external sources via the mini-RCA jacks of its AV Pod. The AV500 case is made of brushed aluminum and forms a solid, rugged, dense box with a built-in LCD screen.

Three formats of the AV500 were manufactured, containing either 40, 60, or 100 GB hard disk drives, each format using a different size and shape of battery. Sometimes the specific format is referenced by combining the model name with the hard disk drive format, e.g., the AV5100 to designate the AV500 with a 100 GB hard drive. The AV5100 has an optional triple-life battery pack.

Data transfer for the AV500 is provided through its USB ports. The AV500 can act as either a USB controller or a USB device, using its USB A and USB B ports respectively. A memory card reader would be read through the USB A port, for example, but a home computer would access the AV500 through the USB B port.

An optional camera attachment (digital minicam) was available for the AV500 from late December 2005 to mid-2006, when Archos discontinued its production. The minicam records video directly to the Archos' hard disk drive in DivX format. The camera is powered from the AV500 unit via its single video cable. A control unit in the middle of the cable contains a high-quality microphone and a begin/end recording control button.

The AV500 was released on Friday June 10, 2005. It weighs 255 g for the 30 GB Model and 315 g for the 100 GB Model. Archos has replaced the AV product line with its Generation 4 series.

=== AV700 ===
The Archos AV700 was the turning point for Archos to change the way they sell these devices to the public. The previous slogan, "Think Smaller" was seen as inappropriate for the purpose, so they then changed it to "On The Go".

The AV700 comes in 40, 80 or 100 gigabyte models. The built-in screen resolution is 420 x 234. It is a digital video recorder and it is possible to record video from an external source, too. Like the Gmini 400 series, the AV700 also has a built-in Mophun gaming engine.

This device was released Monday May 23, 2005, and weighs 590 g.

In 2006, Archos developed the TV-Edition from the AV700, the AV700TV.

== PocketDish ==
The AV700 and AV500, along with the Gmini 402, were sold under the PocketDish brand of Dish Network, though the original Archos logos remained. They were named the AV700E, AV500E, and AV402E respectively. While the AV700E and AV402E are listed as sold out, the AV500E is still listed as available even though the standard AV500 has been discontinued.
