= Sinenjongo High School =

Public high school in Joe Slovo Park, Milnerton, Cape Town, South Africa

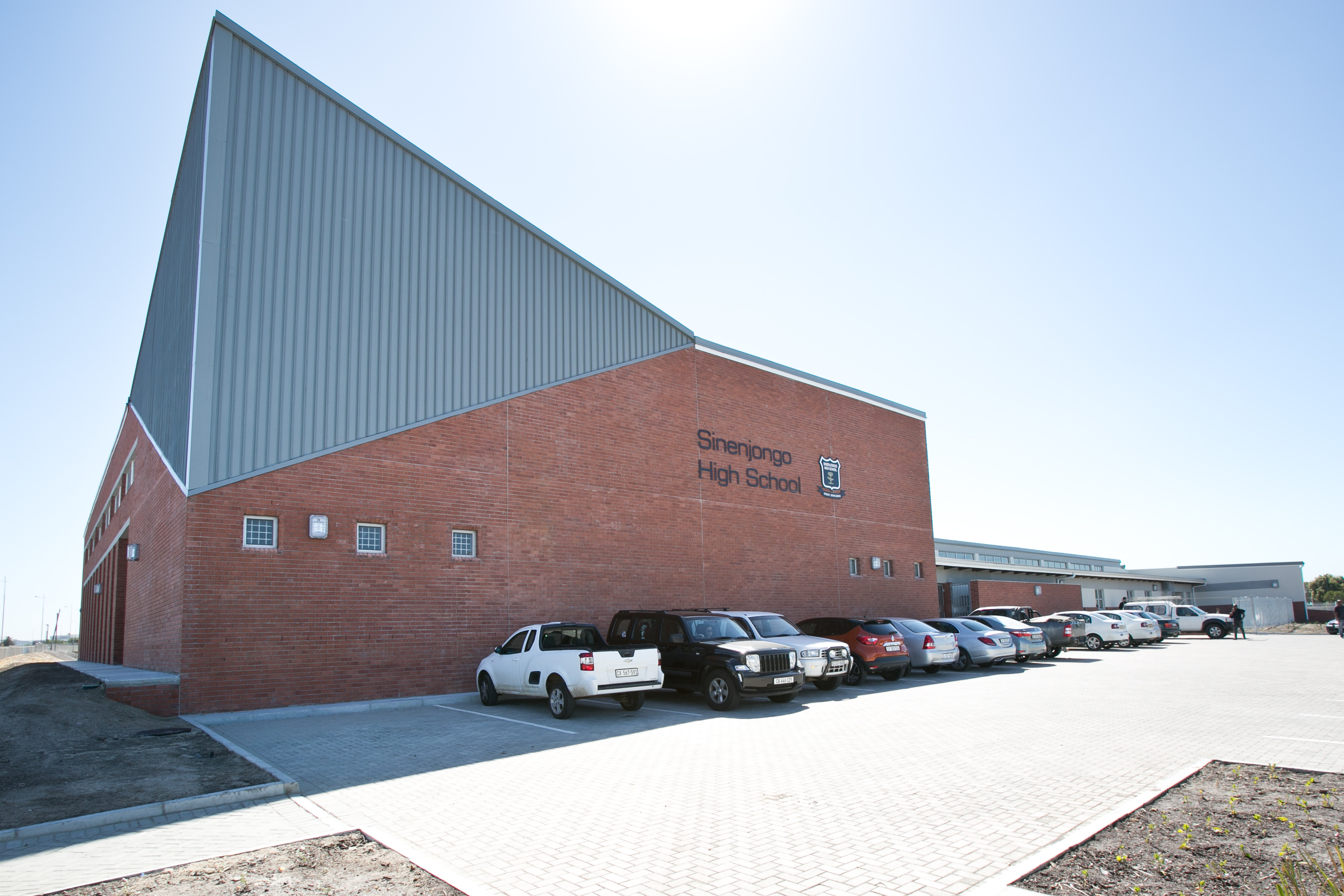

Location
- Joe Slovo Park, Milnerton, Cape Town, South Africa; 33°52′25.68″S 18°30′34.56″E;

Information
- Type: Public and paying; mixed gender
- Motto: Isiseko senkcubeko The foundation of development
- Headmistress: Mrs Khuselwa Malinga-Nopote
- Staff: 41 teachers
- Grades: 8–12
- Enrollment: more than 1400
- Houses: No residence halls
- Colours: Blue and grey

Sinenjongo High School is a high school in Joe Slovo Park, Milnerton, Cape Town, South Africa.

== History ==
In 1993, Elda Mahlentle started a school (the Elda Mahlentle Primary School) in the informal settlement called Chuku Town, opposite the racehorse stables in Milnerton. Grades 1 to 4 were housed all in one small shack. By the end of 1994 the school had expanded up to Grade 9 and consisted of eight container classrooms. The Department of Education subsidised the school through payment of ten teachers' salaries.

In 1996, the new houses were being built in Joe Slovo and so the school moved there with 16 educators. After lengthy negotiations the school finally became a public school in 2004. Elda Mahlentle Primary School became Sinenjongo High School and Marconi Beam Primary School.

== Gaining recognition ==
External videos
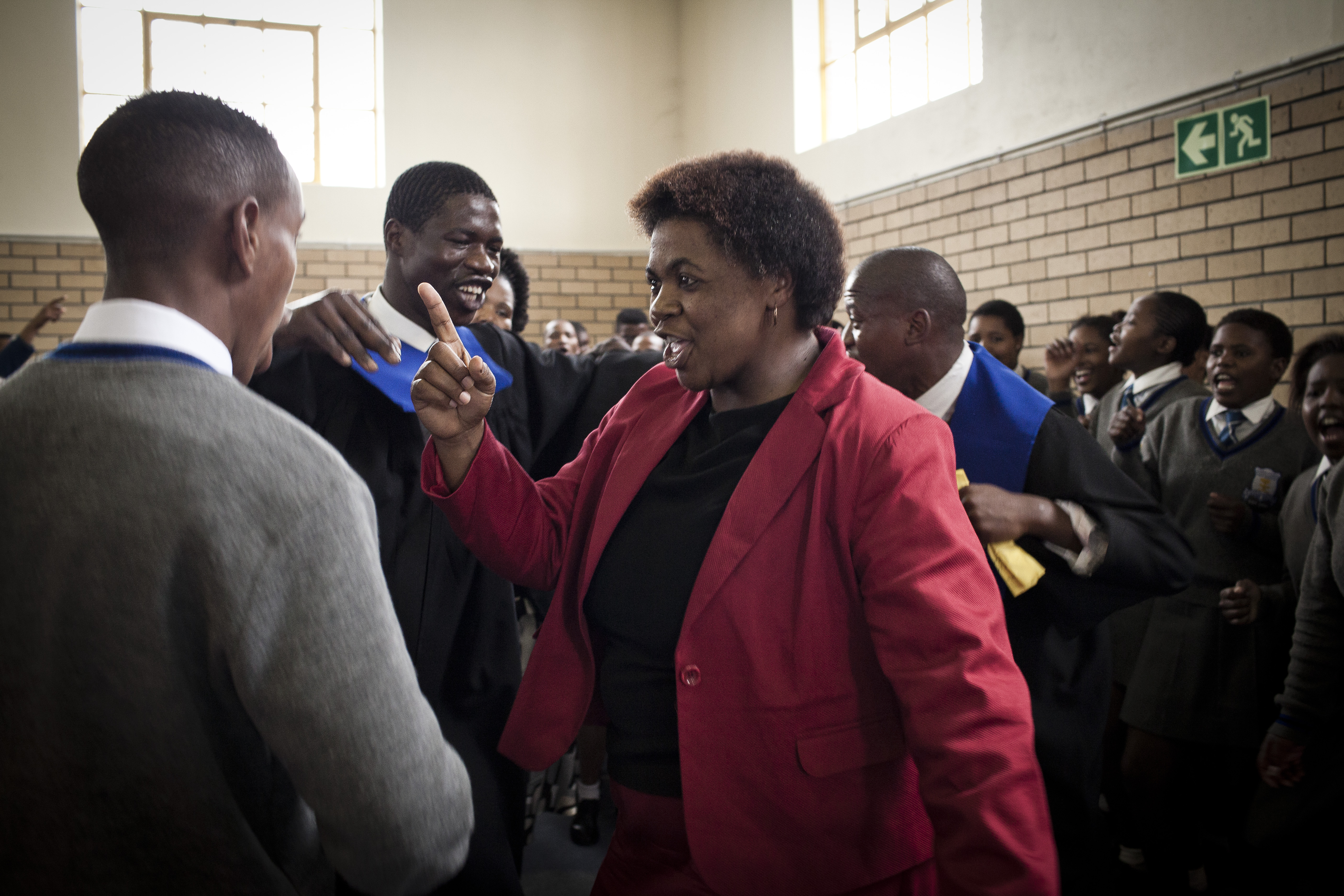
- Malinga Nopote – Excellence Through Trust, TEDx

Rabie Property Group has taken on Sinenjongo High School as the major beneficiary of their Corporate Social Investment Programme.

Malinga Nopote was appointed as the school principal in July 2010, and spoke at TEDxCapeTownED in 2012 about the remarkable improvement in the pass rate of the school.

The school received an award for being one of the 10 most improved schools in the Western Cape in 2012 from the Western Cape Education Department.

== Resources ==
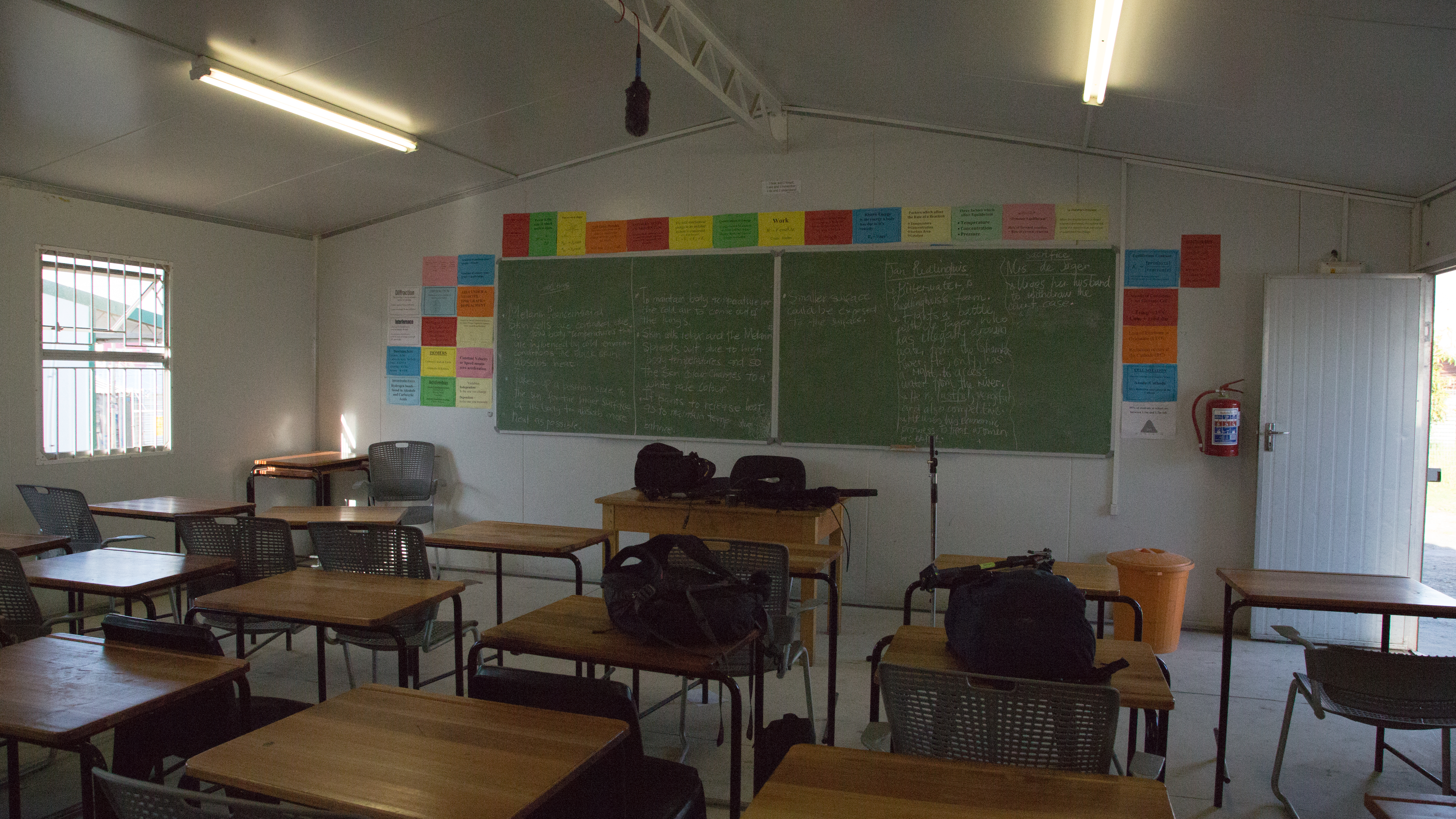
A classroom at Sinenjongo High School

In 2012, the school had:

- 1 prefabricated science laboratory
- 1 small garden
- 2 prefabricated computer laboratories (with less than 40 working computers in total)
- More than 18 prefabricated classrooms, with 27 teachers (in addition there are 4 Maths-and-Science and 1 English teachers, hired by the private sector) and more than 800 learners.

In 2017, Sinenjongo moved to the new school building which has

- 41 Classrooms
- 4 Science laboratories
- A computer laboratory
- A media centre
- A school hall
- A sports field

The new school hall was however burnt down as part of protests held in 2020, and as a result, has been subject to impairment. (Impairment of assets, in terms of the requirements of International Financial Reporting Standards, the IFRS's International Accounting Standard - IAS 36: loss of value of an asset compared to 'book value'; below its recoverable value).

== Academic results ==
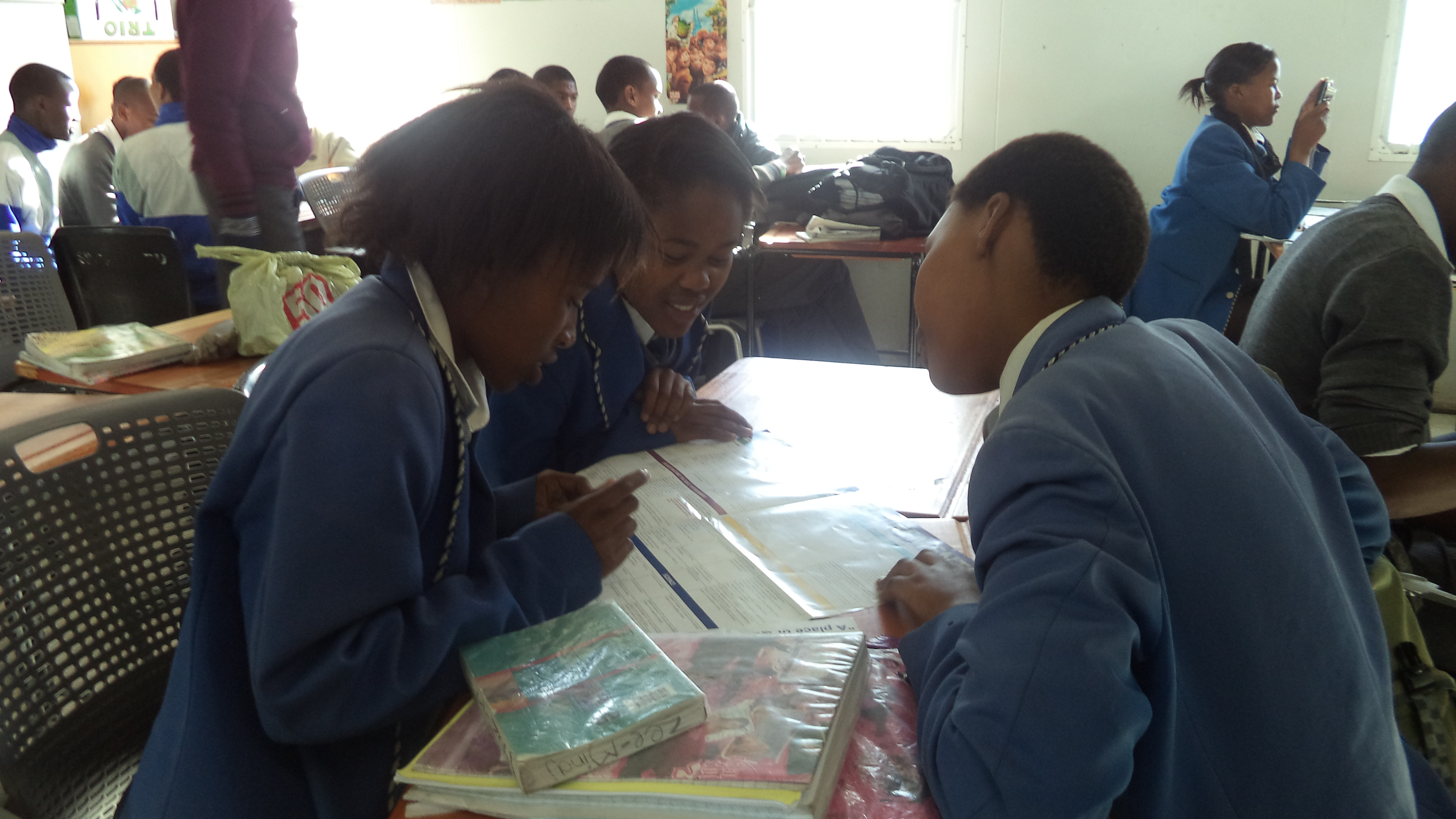
Learners studying in Sinenjongo High School

From 2010, the school has obtained a high pass rate and has been graduating students who matriculate to a university level, called a Bachelor pass.

Year	Pass Rate	Number of learners	Bachelors	Bachelors Rate
2008	27%	71	3	4%
2009	44%	66	3	5%
2010	98%	44	7	16%
2011	88%	87	19	22%
2012	95%	92	32	35%
2013	93%	91	30	33%
2014	89%	137	33	24%
2015	91%	149	49	33%
2016	85%	149	42	28%
2017	86%	131	34	26%
2018	86%	161	66	41%
2019	78%	146	53	36%

== Other programme participation ==
- Star Schools
- BBN
- ASSET

== Free access to Wikipedia ==
Grade 11A Class who penned the open letter for free access to Wikipedia on their cellphones, (photographed in May 2013 as the 12A class) reading their open letter

A sample from a Cape Town radio interview between Kieno Kammies and Pam Robertson, Maths and Science teacher at Sinenjongo High School about her class and their campaign for free access to Wikipedia on their cellphones.

In 2012, the 11A grade class at the school lobbied South African cellphone network operators to provide free access to Wikipedia to assist students with research. FNB Connect (a South African ISP) was the first to respond by offering free Wikipedia browsing during certain hours to their own clients. While this offer is not available to cellphone users, it will put more pressure on the cellphone network operators to offer the same.

In May 2013, the school was visited by Victor Grigas and Charlene Music from the Wikimedia Foundation to shoot a documentary about the school and this campaign.

External videos
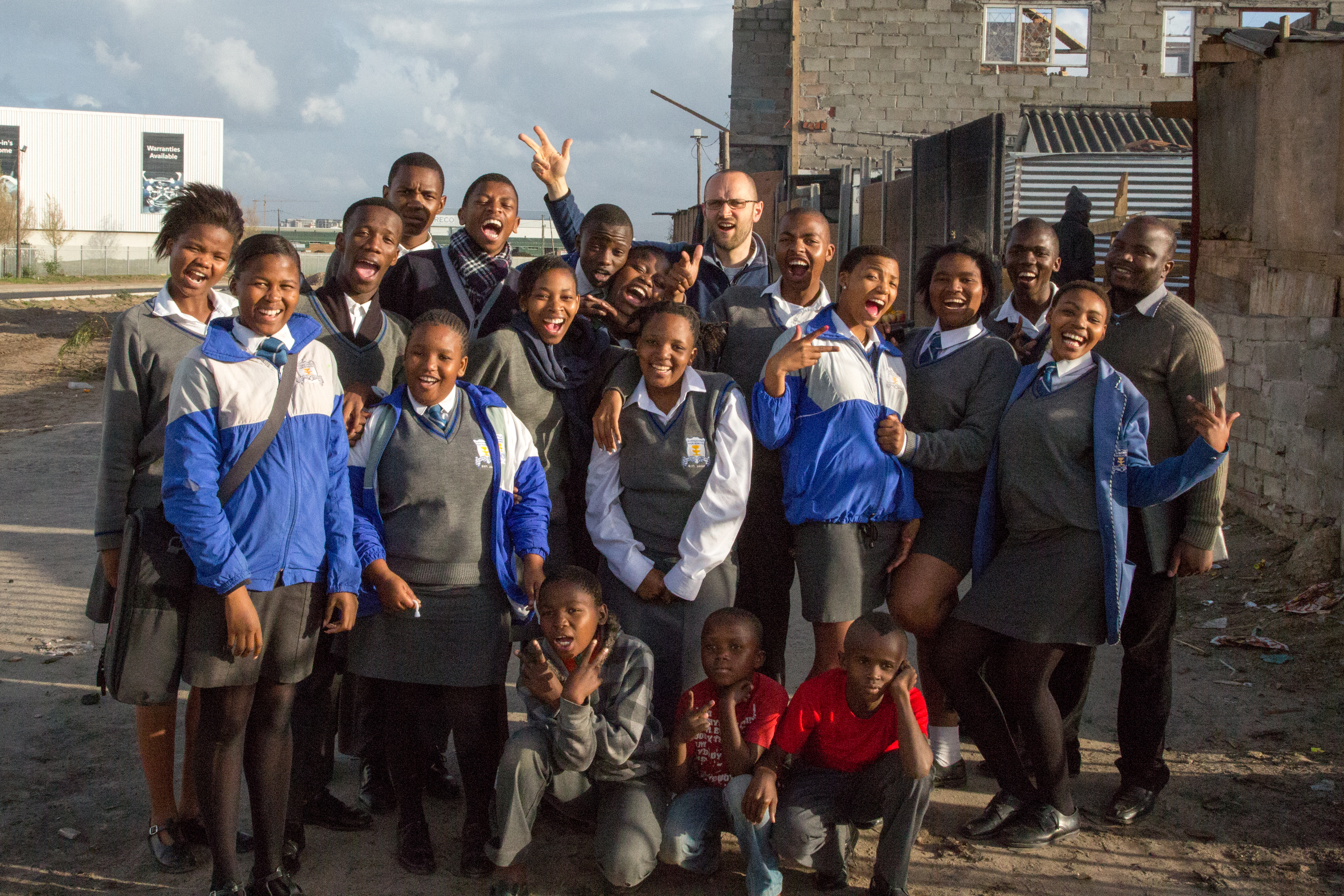
- SA #NekNomination: Free Access to Wikipedia, (3:09), response from the MTN Group, 14 February 2014

Plus, in June 2013, national, provincial and local newspapers, published the students' letter and had articles written about it, especially on the week preceding the South African national holiday of 16 June "Youth Day". The letter has received a voice beyond its home-province, the Western Cape, to provinces like the Gauteng and the KwaZulu Natal and continues to strengthen it through the Free Access to Wikipedia from Cellphones Facebook page.

On 14 February 2014, in response to a NekNomination challenge from Five Roses Tea, the cellphone operator MTN Group announced via a YouTube video that they would provide access to Wikipedia without data charges. A NekNomination is an internet craze that started as a drinking game, but developed into an online challenge to make a positive difference in South Africa.

The Gr 12A learners have written a number of articles for the IsiXhosa Wikipedia. 'Ukucinezeleka kwamanina' (Oppression of Women) by Sinako Mtakati took first prize in a competition held in August 2013. In 2014, grade 11A learners joined WikiAfrica and started editing and creating articles. Nicholas Dodo, Sinoxolo Cotyi, Esethu Dudumashe, Asiya Bucwa and Sesethu Mdikane joined Lead SA in association with WikiAfrica at an Edit-a-thon.

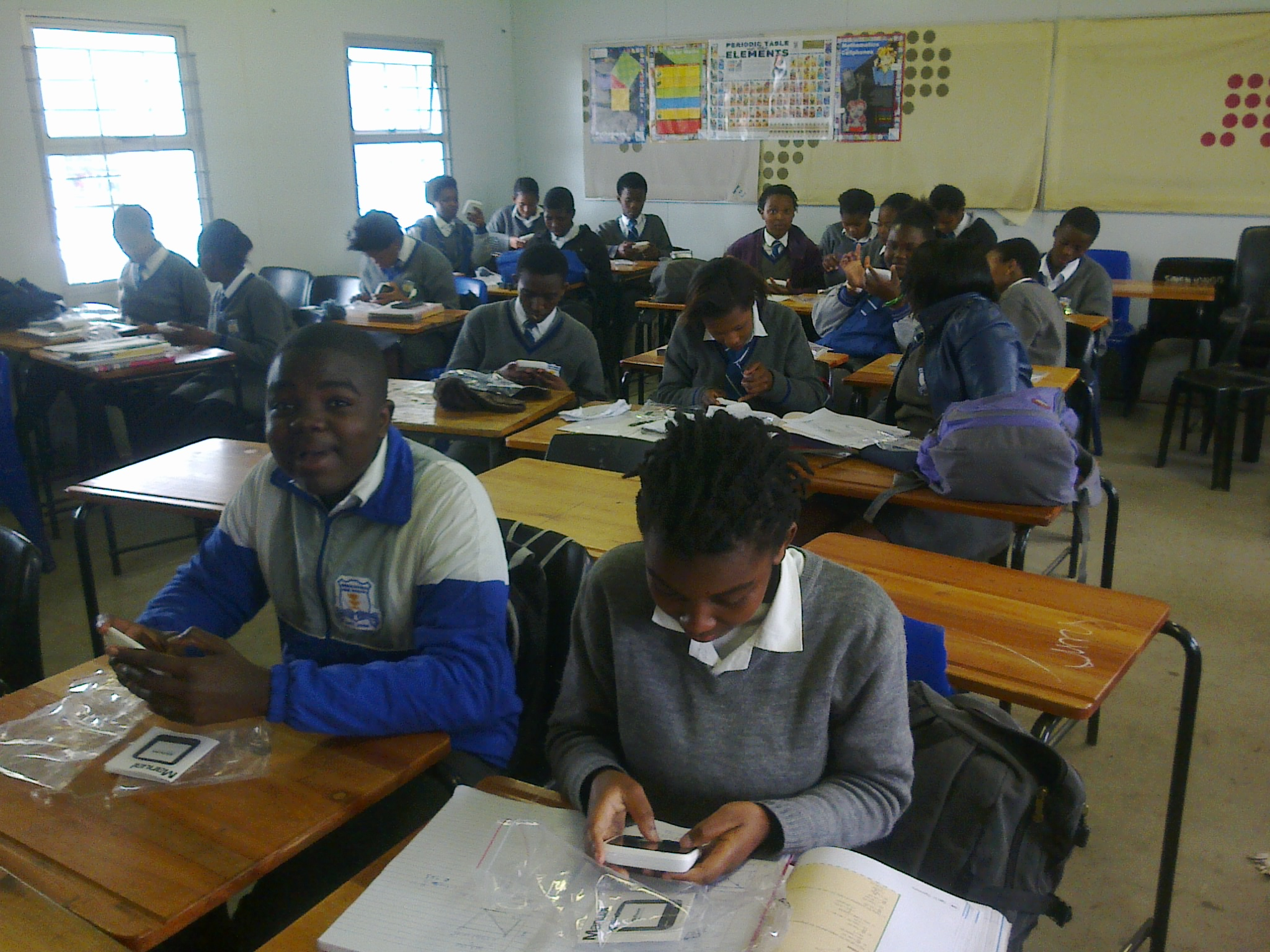
WikiReaders being used in Sinenjongo High School

In late 2013, Sinenjongo learners received more than 95 WikiReaders with mixed funds from a Wikimedia individual engagement grant and an Indiegogo campaign.

== Annual events ==
There is a Careers day for the Grade 8s and Grade 9s where people from different career fields speak to the learners and let them know about those career fields. This is done because the learners in Grade 10 have to choose subjects that they'll major in until matriculation. The other grades' pupils get included too.

Annually there is an academic awards ceremony for the Grade 12 class. It is also their valedictory.

A month before the valedictory, the school has a social farewell celebration for the Grade 12 class known as the "Matric Dance" or "Matric Ball"

== Gallery ==
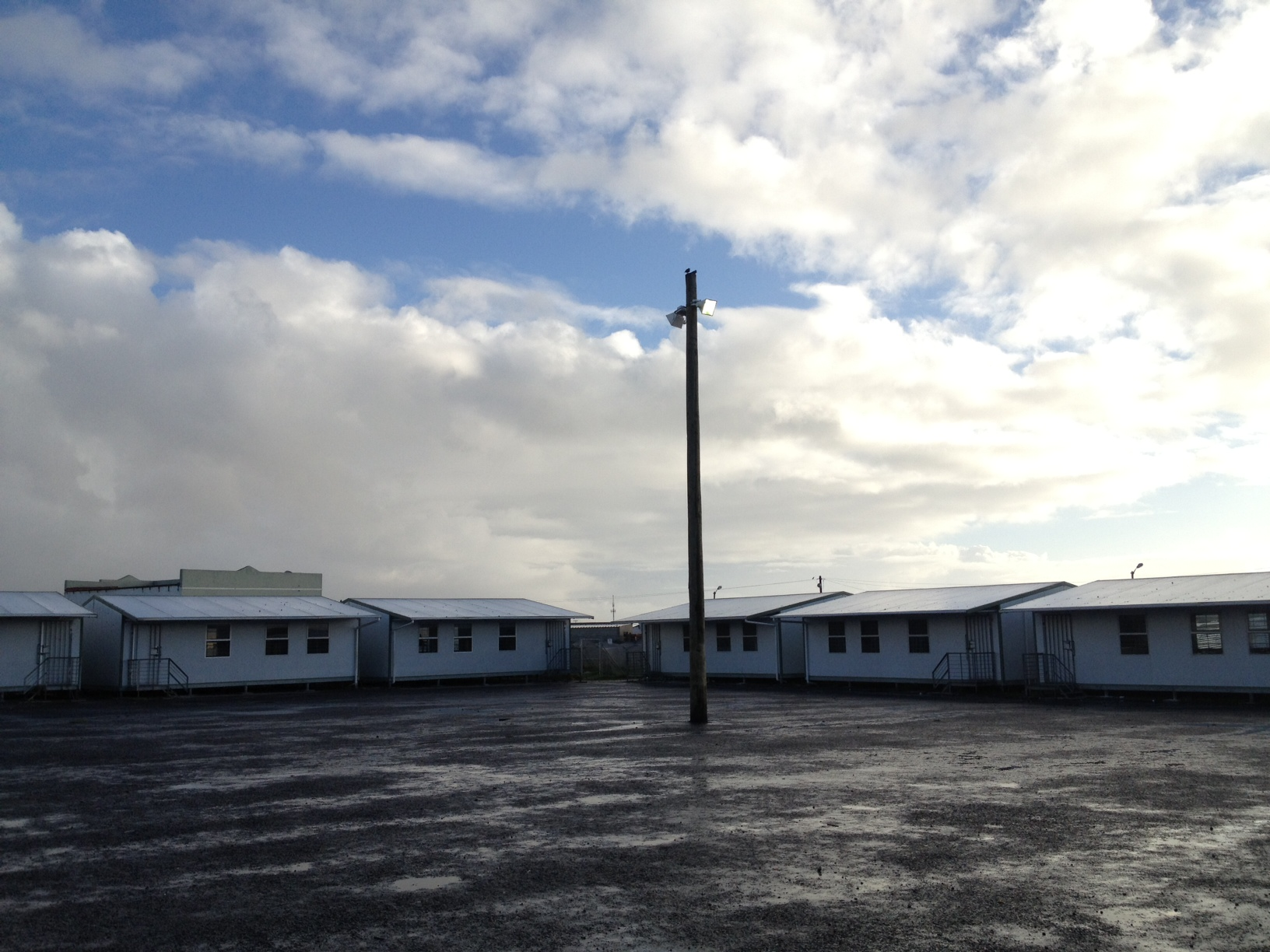
Old School courtyard in 2013

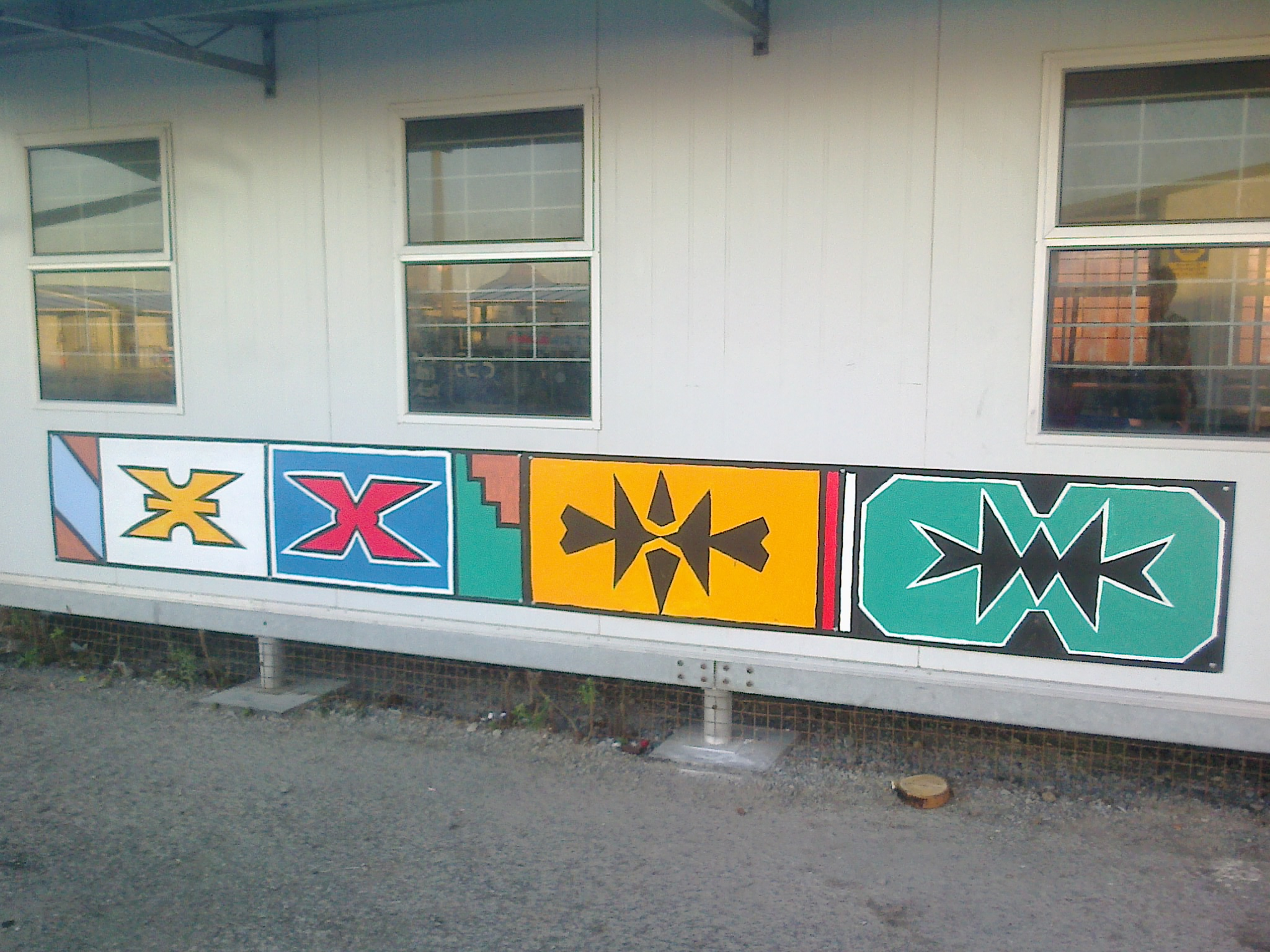
Murals at Sinenjongo

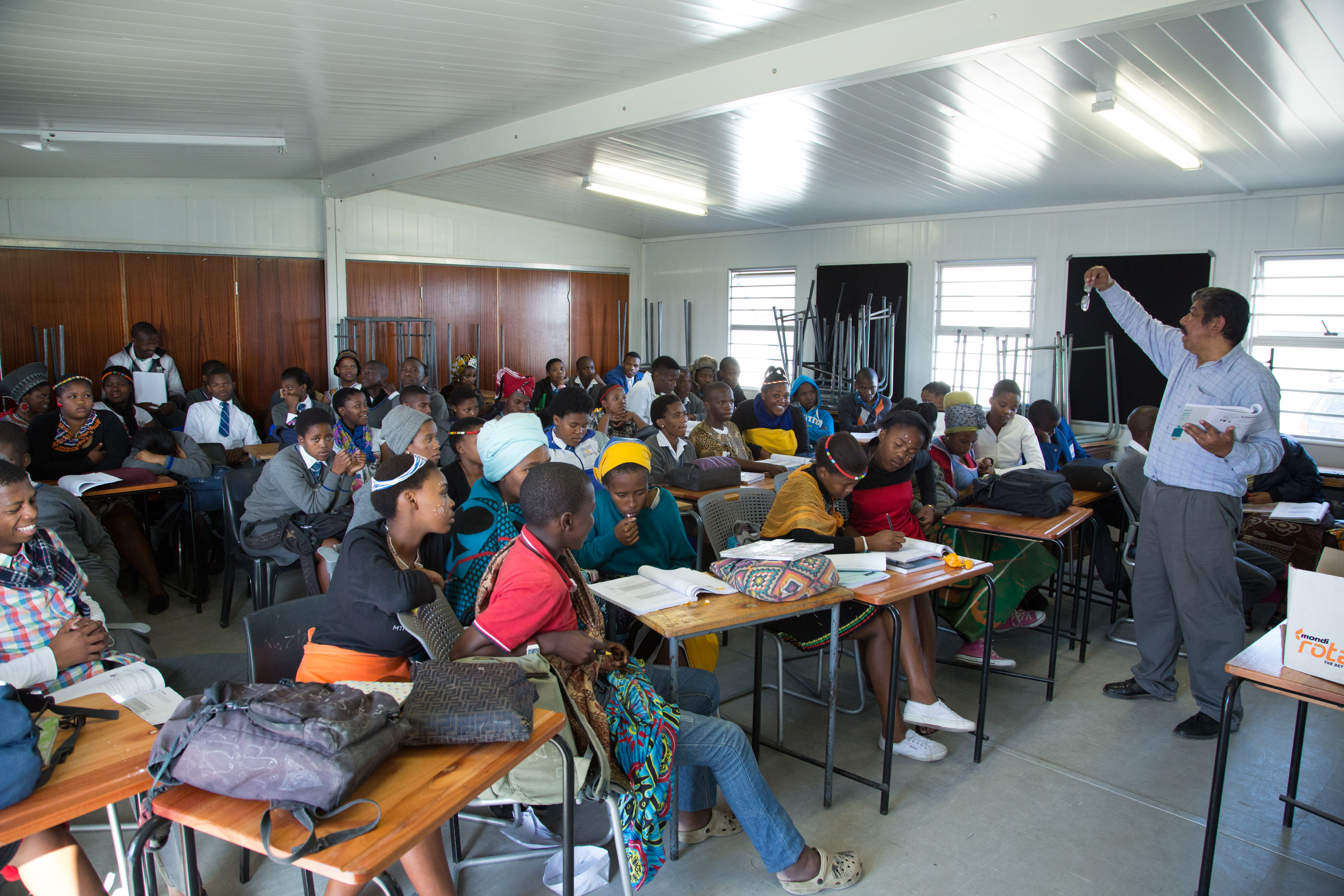
Class in session

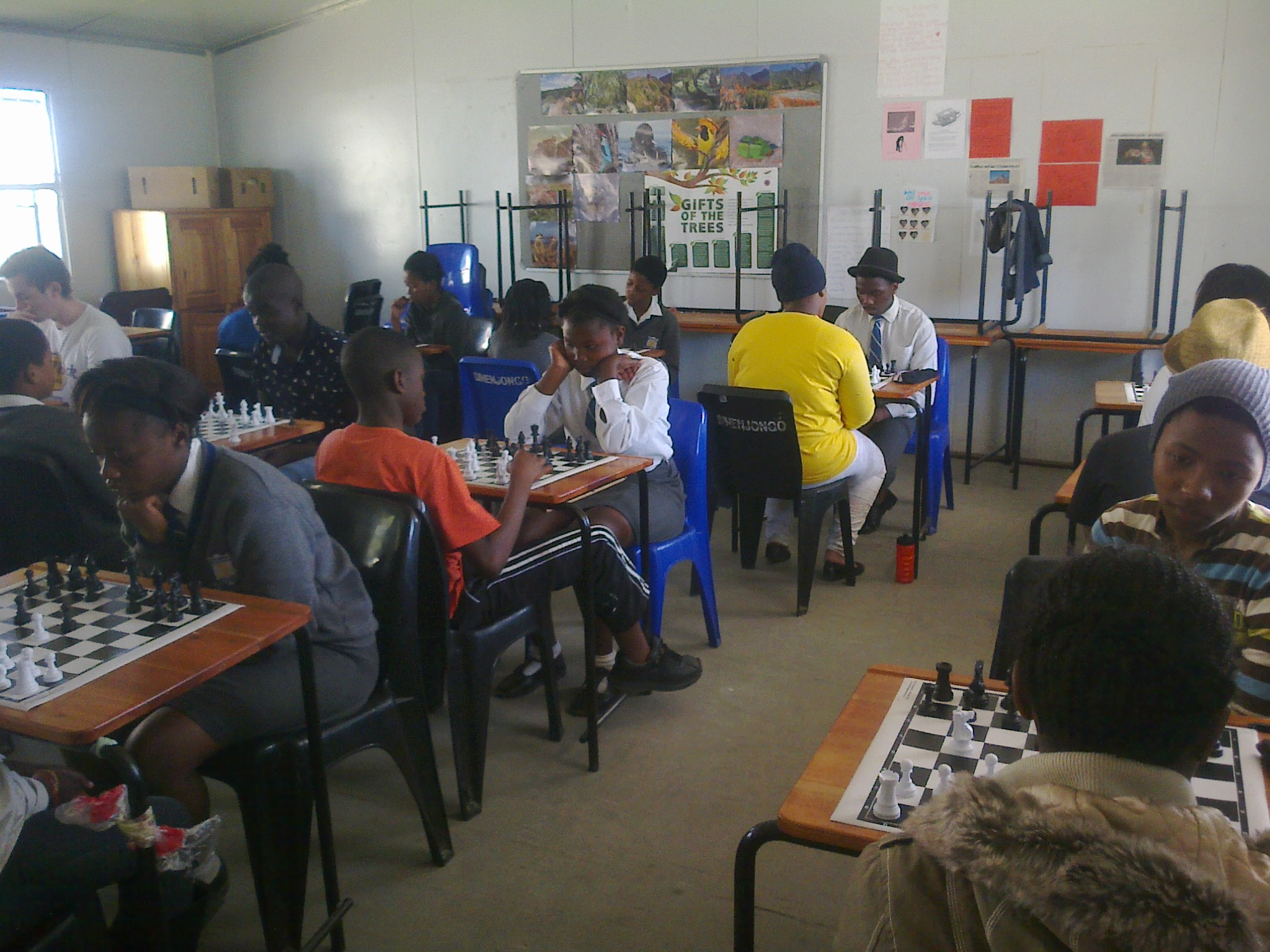
Chess 2014

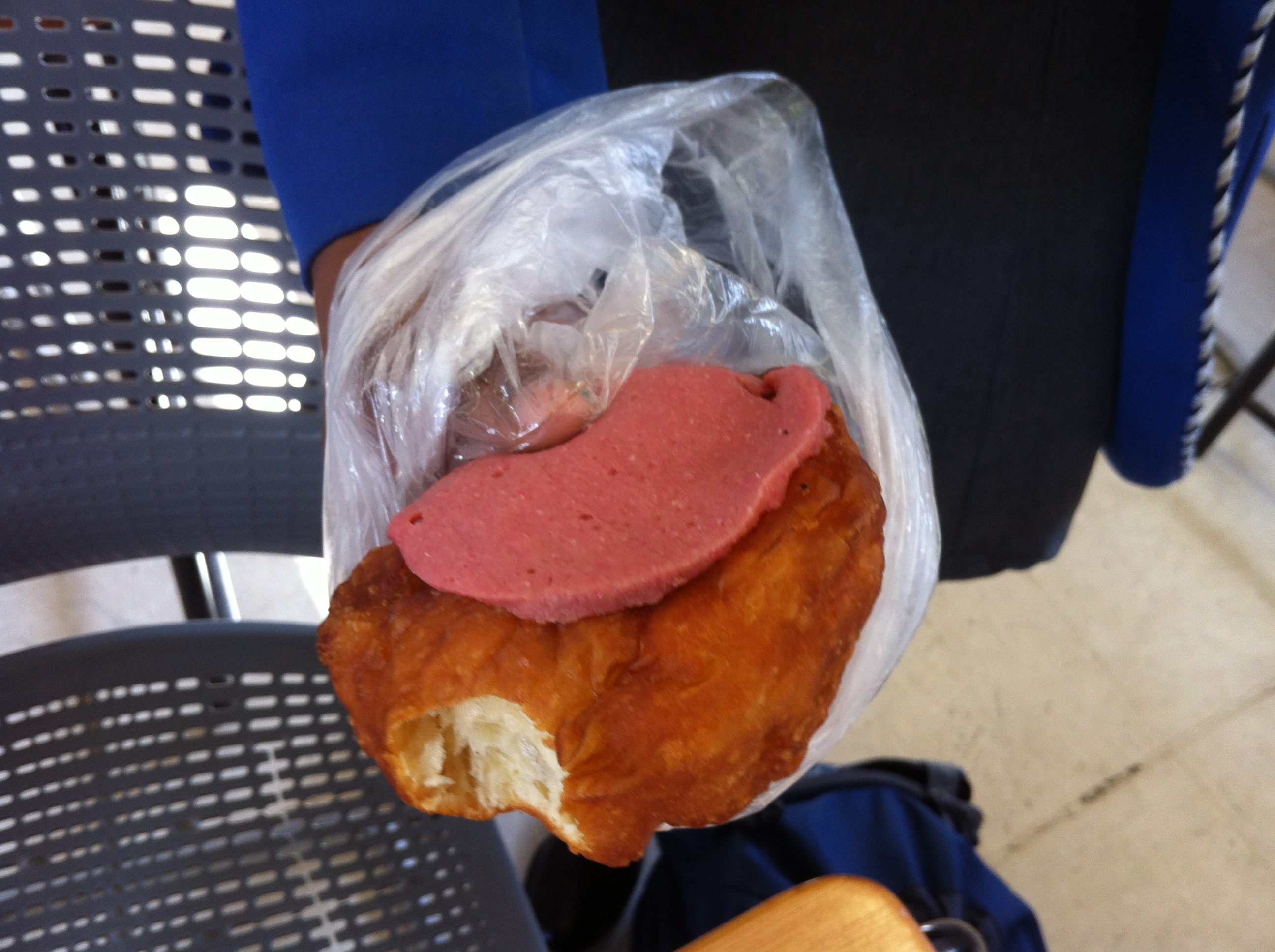
A Vetkoek served at the school

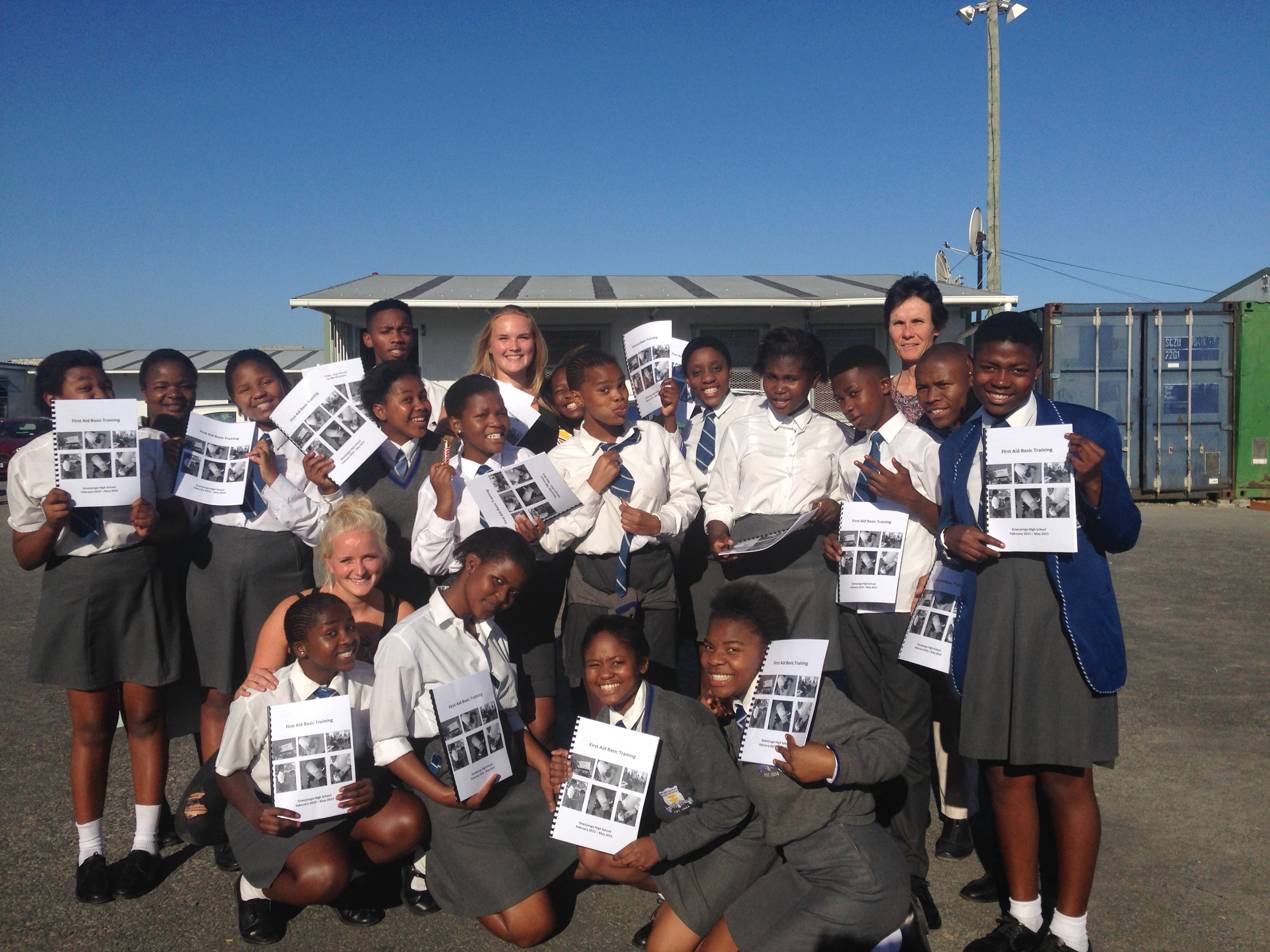
First Aid 2015

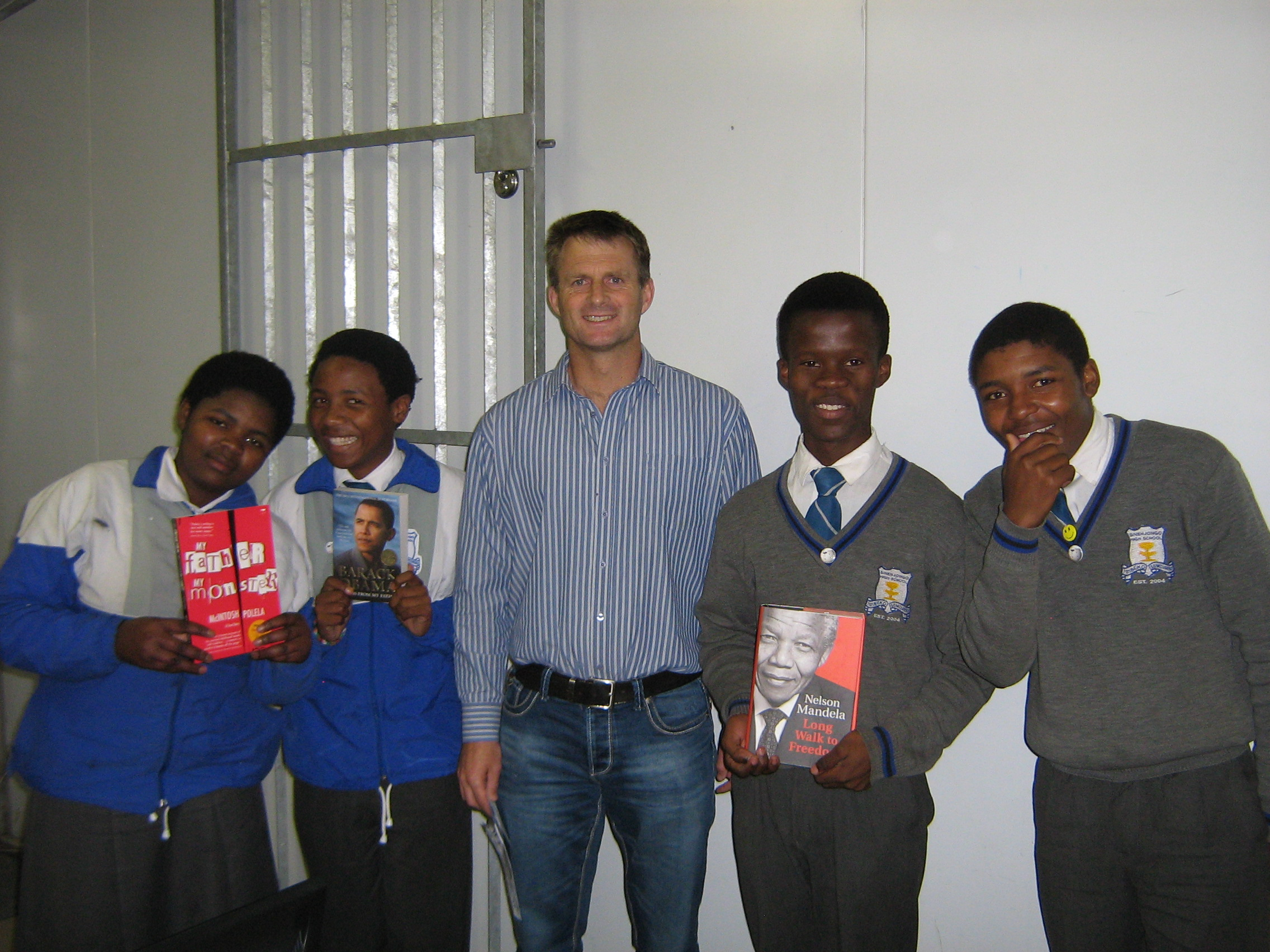
Sinenjongo 2014 Wikipedia competition winners

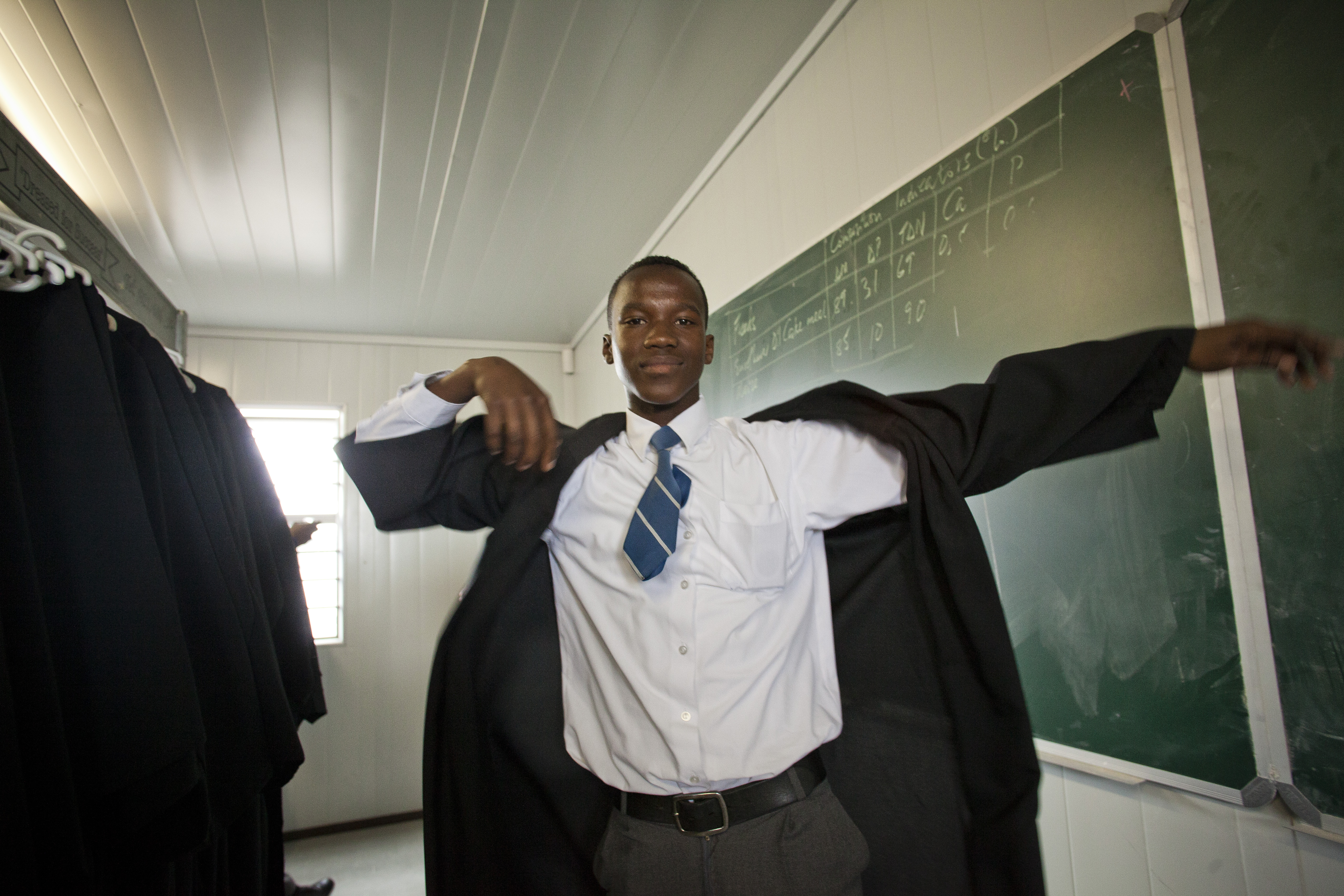
Ntsika 'prince Lain' Kellem, a graduate of Sinenjongo High School
