= 604 (disambiguation) =

604 is the year 604 AD.

604 may also refer to:

- 604 (number)
- 604 (album), an album by Ladytron
- Goa trance, a style of Trance music, is often referred to as "604"
- Area code 604, an area code in southwestern British Columbia, Canada
- Peugeot 604, an executive car
- 604 Records, a record label owned by Nickelback lead singer Chad Kroeger
- IBM 604, a programmable punch card electronic calculator
- PowerPC 604, a PowerPC processor
- Socket 604, for Intel Xeon processors
- Archos Generation 4, a Portable Video Player
- 604, a song by Anthrax on their album Volume 8: The Threat Is Real
- Glasflügel 604, glider
