= Archos Generation 4 =

Series of portable media players

Archos 504
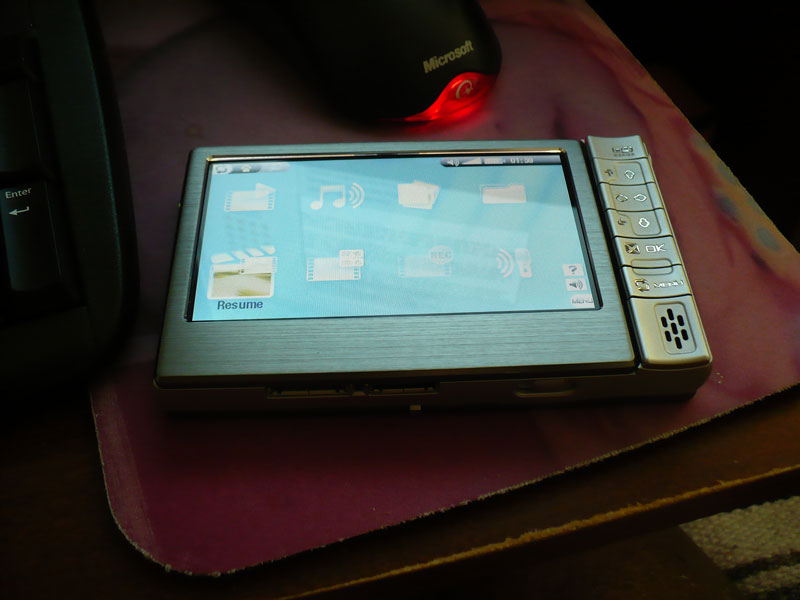
- Storage: 30 GB
- Display: 480x272 resolution, Truecolor, 4.3" glossy TFT LCD
- Graphics: MPEG-4 AVI, WMV. With plug-in: H.264, AAC, MPEG, MPEG2, JPEG, BMP, PNG
- Sound: Stereo MP3, WMA, Protected WMA, WAV. With plug-in: AAC5, AC3
- Input: With DVR Station/ Travel Adapter: Voice recorder and Line-in in WAV format
- Camera: With DVR Station/ Travel Adapter: NTSC/PAL/SECAM in MPEG-4 AVI with stereo sound, VGA resolution @ 30 or 25 f/s
- Connectivity: USB 2.0 in MSC or MTP
- Power: Battery: Music playback: 14 hrs, Video playback: 4 hrs. Removable Battery; USB, optional: DVR Station, Wall outlet
- Dimensions: 5.1" x 3" x 0.7"
- Weight: 9.17 oz

Archos Generation 4 were a series of Archos portable media players released from 2006 through 2007. The Generation 4 series is an upgrade to the previous AV and Gmini series, primarily the AV500s. There are 8 models in all. All players are Microsoft PlaysForSure compatible.

Archos employed a philosophy of producing a modular player, making the standard 04 unit base price cheaper with the option of adding on additional features for additional costs. Using the DVR Station or the DVR Travel Adapter, each unit can record from TV and other standard video sources. The DVR Station and DVR Travel Adapter are not included with the units and must be purchased separately.

== Features ==
=== DVR Station ===
The DVR station (digital video recorder) is available as an optional accessory for the 4th Gen players and allows the user to record TV or other video sources such as satellite/cable box, VCR, DVD player or camcorder in MPEG-4 format. You can record instantaneously or make scheduled recordings using a program built into the players.

The DVR station also allows you to turn the players into camcorders by connecting most digital cameras into the DVR station or you can the optional Archos helmet camera. It records the video directly on the 30 GB hard drive in MPEG-4 format.

== Criticism ==
The Generation 4 products are often criticized for charging for accessories and audio and video codec support that originally came packaged with the last generation AV series players. These include the DVR capabilities, and support for files such as MPEG-1. Not all video codecs work right out of the box. Each unit is capable of playing MPEG-2/VOB videos with Dolby 5.1 Sound (AC3) sound and H.264 videos with AAC sound, however separate plugins must be purchased to unlock these capabilities.

The 604 WiFi has been criticized for its somewhat slow web browser and lower screen quality in comparison to the 604. The latter is the effect of adding the touchscreen which required the screen to be matte rather than glossy.

The 504 has received some issues with static electricity problems.

The 404 Camcorder has received positive reviews for its wide range of features and low price, however the unit has also been criticised for a low-quality image for still shots, comparable to a cell phone.

== Versions ==
=== Portable Video ===
==== 604 ====
The 604 is the flagship model, and the main successor to the AV500. Features include a 30 GB HDD, a 4.3 inch, 16:9 aspect ratio widescreen WQVGA screen, a removable battery, a kickstand, and the ability to record video and audio from line-in sources (via the optional docking station or travel adapter), or the included microphone. It is thinner than the 504, and about the same thickness as the 404 and 404 camcorder. The screen is glossy unlike the 604 WiFi and the 404, which have semi-matte finishes. The 604 family uses the Texas Instruments DaVinci DM644x processor.

==== 604 WiFi ====
The Archos 604 WiFi is a touch-screen multimedia player which also provides access to the Internet. It has the full capabilities of the standard 604 with the added built in Wi-Fi, touchscreen, and a web browser. The touchscreen required the screen to have a matte finish and the Wi-Fi module adds an extra stub to the unit's side. It is otherwise identical to the 604.

The 604 WiFi uses the 802.11g Wi-Fi connection and features the Opera 8.5 web browser. This allows for full internet browsing. The surfing experience on the ARCHOS 604 WiFi is further enhanced by Opera's Medium Screen Rendering (MSR) technology to change the page to suit the 4.3 inch screen. The Wi-Fi capabilities also lets the device act as a file server and connecting the device to a home network to transfer files or play content directly from the network. While the device has no other native Internet software such as an e-mail client, some forms of e-mail and instant messaging may be accessed via the browser if that software is browser compatible. The Opera implementation currently lacks Adobe Flash capability or a Java virtual machine but does support JavaScript.

==== 704 WiFi ====
The 704 WiFi operates similar to the 604 WiFi but with a 7-inch screen that has a resolution of 800x480 (WVGA). The side buttons have also been removed as the touch screen becomes the main means of navigation. This is the follow-up to the AV700. The processor used is reported by third parties as a Texas Instruments DM420 (a technology neighbor to the early members of the DaVinci family, the likely full name probably is DM320DM420DSC; that was seemingly only available to selected customers).

==== 704 TV ====
A modified 704 released in France only where the integrated Wi-Fi is replaced with a TV tuner. This is the follow-up to the AV700TV.

==== 504 ====
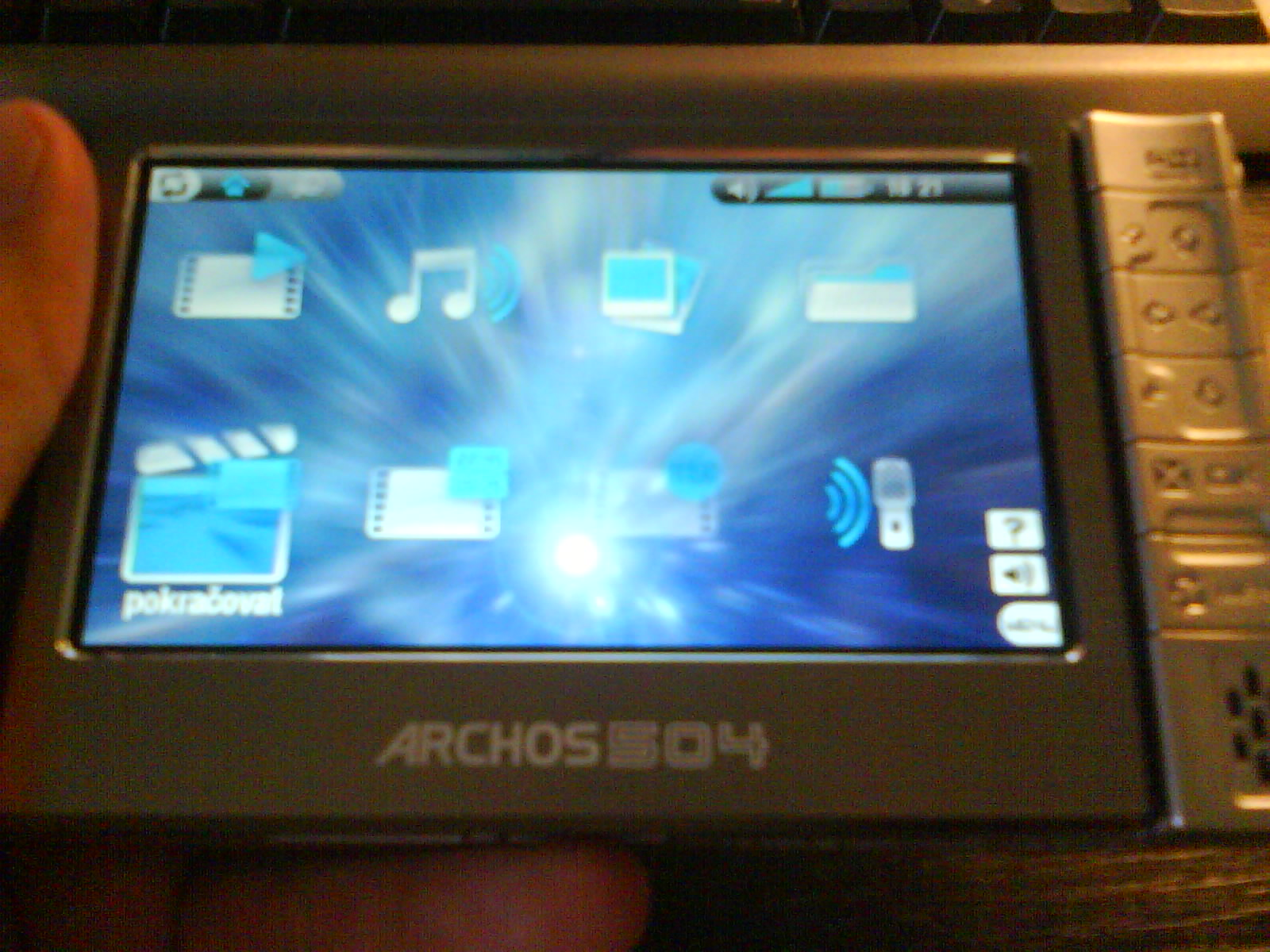
Archos 504

The 504 is positioned as a bigger, thicker model with large amounts of storage in comparison to the 604. It is available in 40 GB, 80 GB or 160 GB capacities, and has a removable battery. It retains all of the 604's features. Unlike the 604, removing the battery exposes the 504's 2.5-inch hard drive. Users have reported successfully upgrading the hard drive themselves. However, this ability has been cut off in firmware version 1.5 and later, but the users have been able to install the older firmware. The 504 uses the Texas Instruments DaVinci DM644x processor.

==== 404 ====
Designed to be the budget level PVP, the 404 was created as a smaller version of the 604. The 404 retains many of the same features and all accessories and plug-ins for the 604 are also compatible. The major difference is the screen. It is shortened to 3.5 inches and is not wide. The screen has a QVGA resolution and 24-bit color. The unit has 30 GB of storage and a voice recorder microphone. The main market point from Archos was that it was similar in size to comparably priced PMPs but has about twice the screen size (by area compared to 2.5 inches). The 404 family uses the Texas Instruments DaVinci DM644x processor.

==== 404 Camcorder ====
A variation of the standard 404, adding a 1.3 MP camera on the back to take stills images and video recordings. It also includes all the features of the standard 404. While it is the only one of the series to have the camera built-in, the other players can use the "helmet cam" accessory for similar operation. It is the follow-up of the Gmini 402 Camcorder.

=== Portable Audio ===
==== 204 ====
The device has 20 GB of storage. It supports no video playback. The display is an OLED type with 1.8" and a color depth of 3x6 bit. Other features are the same as for the Archos Gmini XS 202 that comes with a 2" grayscale display.

==== 104 ====
A 1" 4 or 6 GB hard drive player for music and photos without video playback.

== GPL code release ==
In order to comply with the Linux license (the GPL), the source code for some of the firmware in the 4th Generation players has been released.

=== QTopia ===
The 605 WiFi, along with, reportedly, the 705 WiFi and 604 WiFi, were successfully hacked to run the Linux platform QTopia with help from the same users who had done so on the older PMA400.

== See also ==
- Archos Generation 5
