= Pandigital, Inc. =

Electronics manufacturer

- Industry: Electronics
- Founded: 1998; 27 years ago
- Defunct: November 2012
- Fate: Dissolved
- Products: WikiReader

Pandigital, Inc., was a digital photo-frame manufacturer founded in 1998 that around 2010 began to expand its product line to include e-reader, tablets and e-books. Its tablet products included the Planet, Novel, Star, Nova, and SuperNova, and an offline Wikipedia reader called WikiReader.

As of November 2012, Pandigital declared bankruptcy and went out of business. It liquidated its stock on various daily deals websites.

== Tablet models ==
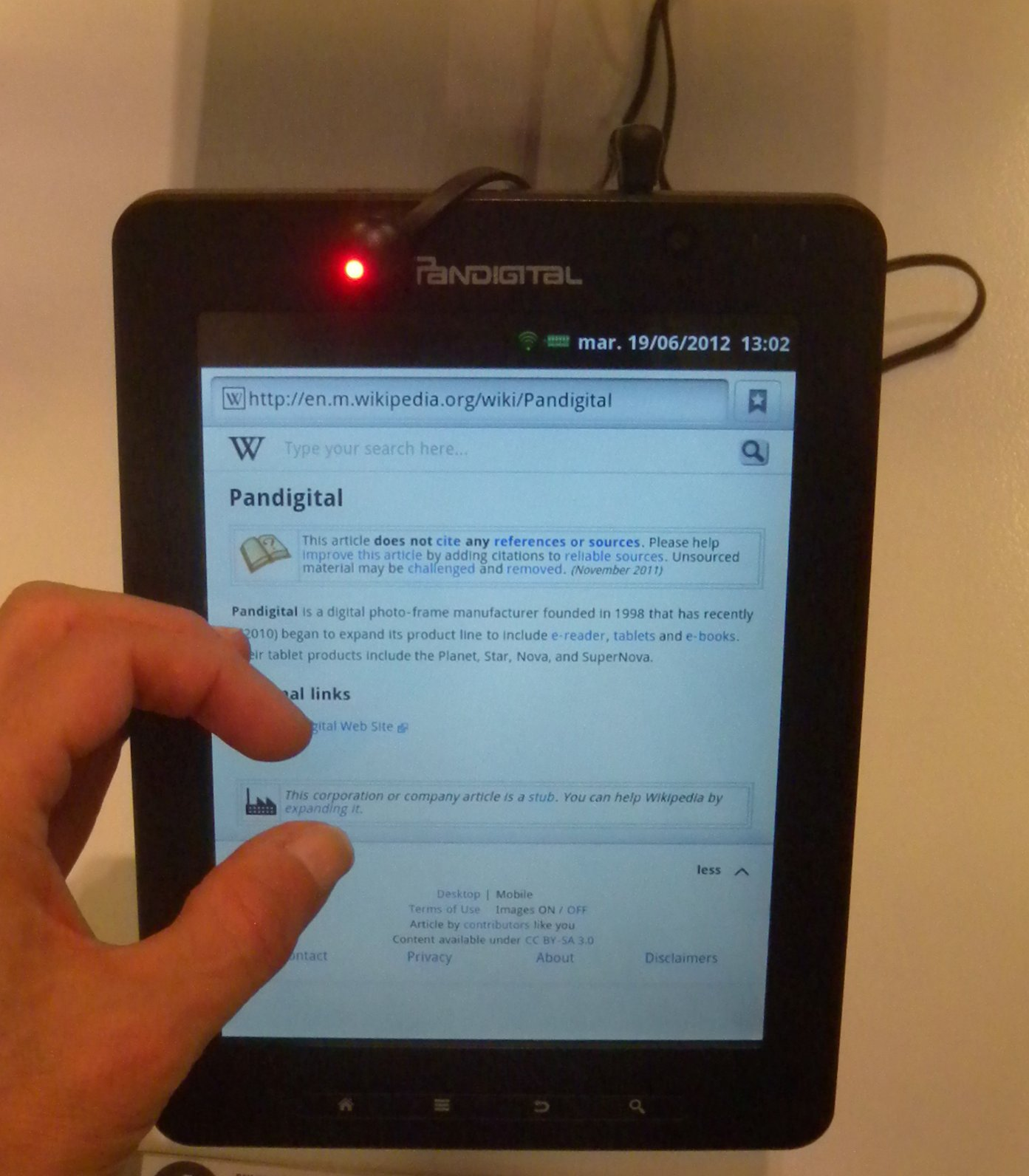
Supernova 8 reader

Name	Screen	Resolution	Processor	RAM	Onboard memory	OS	Other
Novel	9-inch	480x800	ARMv6 800MHz	256 MB	256 MB	Android 2.0 Eclair	Wifi, 2-Axis Accelerometer, Mini USB
Planet	7-inch	800x600	A9 Cortex	256 MB	2 GB	Android 2.2 Froyo	Wifi, HDMI, 2-Axis Accelerometer, Mini USB
Nova	7-inch	800x600	A9 Cortex	256 MB	4 GB	Android 2.3 Gingerbread	Wifi, HDMI, 2-Axis Accelerometer, Mini USB
Supernova	8-inch Capacitive multi-touch	800x600	S5PV210 Cortex 1.06 GHz	512 MB	4 GB	Android 2.3 Gingerbread	Wifi, HDMI, 2-Axis Accelerometer, Mini USB
