= Archos Generation 5 =

Series of portable media players

605 WiFi
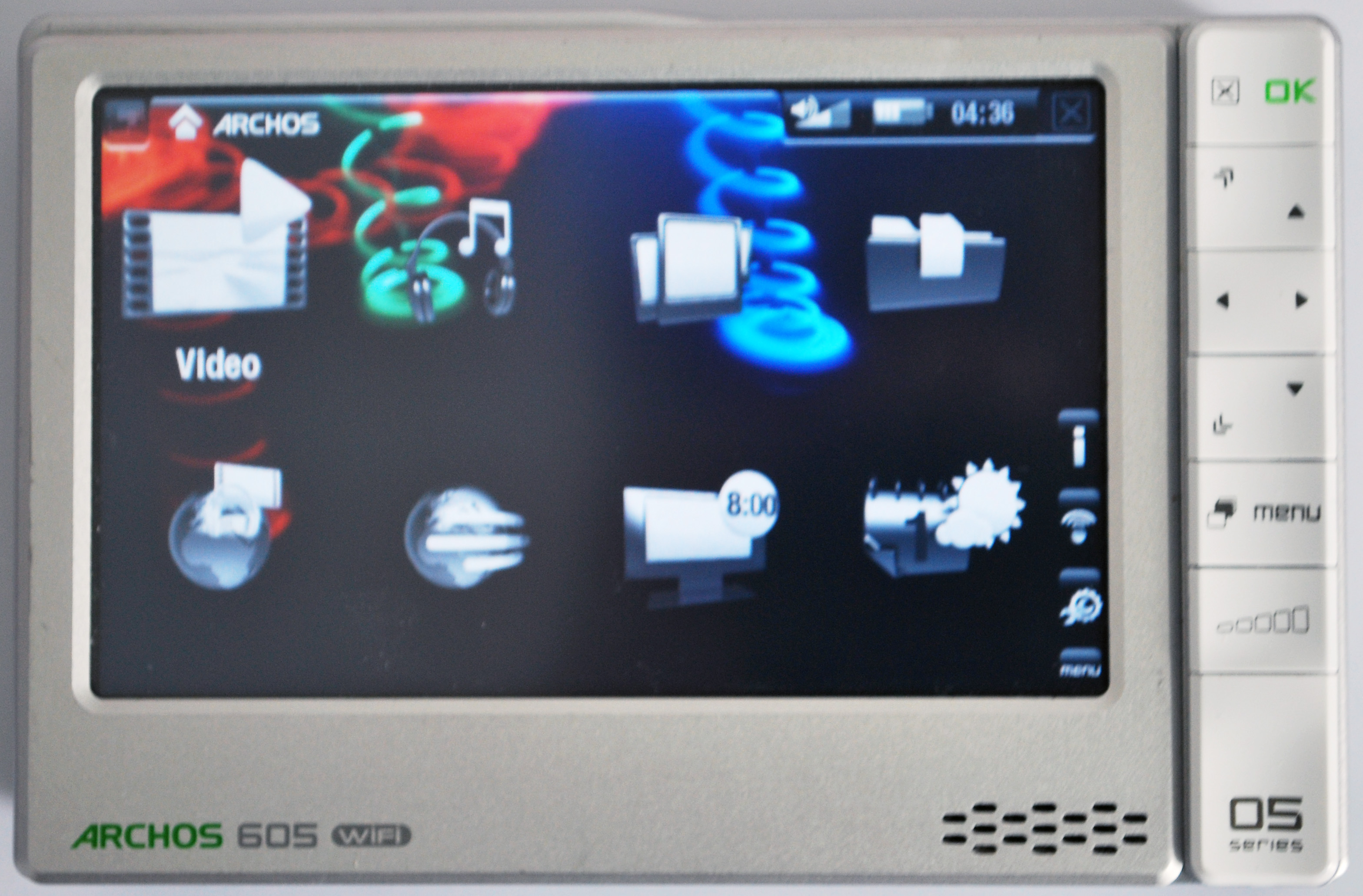
- Manufacturer: Archos
- Operating system: Linux 2.6.10_mvl402
- CPU: Texas Instruments DaVinci TMS320DM6441
- Memory: Intel 28F160C3B 2 MB (Advanced boot flash memory) 64 MB DDR-SDRAM
- Storage: 30 GB, 80 GB, 160 GB HDD 2.5 IDE
- Removable storage: 4 GB with SDHC slot
- Display: WVGA resolution, 24-bit color palette, 4.3" TFT LCD semi-matte touchscreen
- Graphics: MPEG-4 AVI, WMV. with plug-in: H.264, MPEG-2 and AC3 stereo sound; JPEG, BMP, PNG
- Sound: Stereo MP3 decoding @ 30-320 kbit/s, WMA, Protected WMA, WAV. with plug-in:: AAC5, AC3
- Input: with DVR Station/Travel Adapter: Stereo line-in, WAV
- Camera: with DVR Station/Travel Adapter. Records NTSC/PAL/SECAM in MPEG-4 AVI with VGA resolution @ 30 or 25 f/s
- Connectivity: connects through USB in either MSC or MTP, WiFi (802.11g); 3.5 mm Audio, Proprietary dock port
- Power: Music playback: 17 hrs, Video playback: 5.5 hrs. External Battery available. USB, DVR Station, optional Wall outlet
- Dimensions: 4/30 GB: 122 x 82 x 15 mm; 80/160 GB: 122 x 82 x 20 mm
- Weight: 4/30 GB: 5.3oz/6.7oz; 80/160 GB: 9.17oz

Archos Generation 5 is a series of portable media players introduced in 2007.

== 705 WiFi ==
The Archos 705 WiFi was released on November 16, 2007 in capacities of 80 GB and 160 GB, with the same overall design of the last generation and an updated operating system and hardware compatibility. Unlike the 405 and 605 WiFi, the 705 WiFi has an 18-bit color depth instead of 24-bit Truecolor.

== 605 WiFi ==
The Archos 605 WiFi was launched on September 1, 2007. While the player is a technical update from the previous generation, the 605 WiFi is released in larger capacities, not unlike the 504. The 4 GB flash-based version includes a SDHC card slot. The player is also available in hard drive capacities of 20 GB, 30 GB, 40 GB (only in the UK), include a thinner profile and smaller buttons. The button layout remains the same but with the addition of a volume control. The battery is now irremovable, though an extended battery pack is available optionally, and the kickstand is moved to the edge of the player. The 605 WiFi features support for Adobe Flash, which equips a portable version of Opera. An online content portal is linked to directly purchase or rent media from various distributors.

A special edition of the 605 WiFi was released in Europe. This version has a 20 GB capacity and is bundled with Charlie Chaplin movies and a custom engraving on the back. A Harry Potter edition was later released.

=== 605 GPS ===
Archos released a variant of the 605 WiFi with an additional GPS feature. It was available in a 4 GB flash-based capacity and a 30 GB hard drive capacity.

== 405 ==
Flash-based, comes in 2 GB with SDHC expansion, and a 3.5" QVGA TFT screen in 4:3 format. Available in a limited edition lilac colour.

A hard drive version of this player has been released in Europe in a capacity of 30 GB.

== 105 ==
The Archos 105 is a flash-based PMP with a 1.8-inch (46 mm) OLED display that is capable of WMV playback. The player is currently available in a 2 GB capacity.

== Features ==
=== DVR Station ===
The optional DVR station plays back video in DVD-quality resolution through the composite, S-video, RGB or YPbPr video outputs with the audio in stereo or 5.1 surround sound through the S/PDIF output. An external hard drive can be attached to the DVR station via a USB hub to increase the storage capacity. The DVR feature has an infrared emitter that can control many different brands of TVs, cable boxes, and satellite boxes. An online TV guide can show scheduled broadcasts which you can set to be downloaded and viewed at a later time. The DVR station also comes with a QWERTY remote control to surf the web or to use the TV Program Guide directly on a TV screen. Note: The online TV guide service has been discontinued in North America.

=== Content Portal ===
The Archos Content Portals (ACP) allow the 605 WiFi and 705 WiFi to directly purchase or rent videos on the device through wireless internet. The content on the ACPs are provided through other companies that have their own "portal". Currently only CinemaNow has service for North American users. There has also been announced a deal with Paramount in April 2008.

=== Web Browser ===
The web browser for the 605 WiFi and 705 WiFi is an iteration of Opera for devices. Unlike with the 604 WiFi, it is available as an optional plug-in. With Generation 5 Flash 7 support was added. On November 28, 2007, along with game packs, 7 widgets were added free as part of the Web-Browser plug-in. In April 2008, an update to Flash 9 was added giving better compatibility with the latest flash applications.

=== GPS ===
A GPS add-on was announced in April 2008 for the 605 and 705 with support for the Europe, North America, and China regions. The GPS is activated when a clamp is combined with the player, which gives the Archos 605 GPS and real-time traffic report.

=== WebTV & Radio ===
Archos Web TV: This allows you to aggregate and watch streams of web TV and video. Archos Web Radio: This allows you to aggregate and watch streams of web radio and audio.

== Source Code Release ==
Archos has also released the source code for the current generation players. However, hardware locks have disabled any easy attempt at creating homebrew firmware without the use of an exploit.

=== GFT Exploit ===
A software-only exploit called GFT was discovered for several Archos players, including the 605 WiFi and 705 models, that enabled the user to run Linux commands directly on the system, and further uses this to install an SSH server on the system, allowing remote root access. However, the 2.x versions of the firmware have disabled the ability to apply the GFT exploit. This is an undocumented fix on Archos' side and is not listed in the change-form for the release. They automatically include 2.0 and later on all newly shipping 605 units.

=== QTopia ===
The 605 WiFi, along with, reportedly, the 705 WiFi and 604 WiFi, were successfully hacked to run the Linux platform QTopia with help from the same users who had done so on the older PMA400. QTopia can only be installed on units that are compatible with the GFT exploit.

=== openPMA-NG ===
The exploit also triggers the development of openPMA-NG, based on pdaXrom. Updates show compatibility for common Linux applications such as GIMP and Mozilla Firefox

== See also ==
- Portable media player
