= Archos Gmini =

Series of portable media players

Gmini 402
- Storage: 20 GB
- Display: 2.2" LCD 220x176 pixels, 262 000 colours and TV output
- Graphics: DivX/Xvid AVI, MPEG-4 SP, WMV 9/10 up to DVD resolution; JPEG (except progressives) or BMP, Transfer photos from digital camera through USB Host port
- Sound: Stereo MP3 decoding @ 30-320 kbit/s CBR & VBR, WMA (including protected WMA files), WAV (PCM & ADPCM)
- Connectivity: USB 2.0 high-speed device, compatible USB 1.1, PC & Mac, USB Host port compatible Mass Storage Device; Earphones / Audio & Video line out, Microphone in
- Power: Battery: 10 hours for music, 5 hours for video on built-in LCD
- Dimensions: 4.2 in x 2.4 in x 0.7 in
- Weight: 5.6 oz

The Gmini was a series of portable audio and video players released by Archos in 2004 and 2005.

== Portable Video ==
=== Gmini 400 ===
The first audio device to hold a color LCD screen as well as photo, audio and video playback capacities, the Gmini 400 was introduced October 2004.

The player featured MP3, WMA and WAV playback facilities and also loaded user-placed, APIC album covers on the display while the appropriate song was playing. The device was ID3 Tag compatible, and organized users music collection by reading this meta-data. This feature, called ARCLibrary, was intended to provide non-tech savvy users of the device a simple means of organizing audio collection.

The device contained an MPEG-4 player, enabling users to watch MPEG-4 encoded video files in DivX AVI format. The Gmini 400 also had an image viewer compatible with PNG, BMP and JPEG image file formats. There was also functionality built-in within the device to play games available from the manufacturer's website.

In addition to these other features, the Archos Gmini 400 contained a CompactFlash reader enabling the user to slot in a memory card, increasing the unit's capacity, play files stored within the card, and transfer files from the card to the unit. It was not possible to transfer files from the Gmini 400 to the CompactFlash card, presumably to discourage sharing of media files amongst Gmini users.

This device was first released Tuesday, August 31, 2004, and weighs 160 g.

=== Gmini 402 ===
The Gmini 402 is the next model up from the Gmini 400. Featuring PlaysForSure compatibility, the owners of this model could download purchased, protected music, in WMA format, and play them back on the device. This player supported DRM-protected WMV video files, as well as MP3, WMA, AVI, JPG, PNG, and BMP. The device also allowed audio recording, via the headphone jack or the built-in microphone.

As with the Gmini 400, the unit also displayed images with its built-in image viewer. The Gmini 402 also could connect to an external audio source for out-aloud listening, and could connect to external video sources, for watching videos from the device on televisions, etc. The player also included a built-in game engine, Mophun, for 3D style games.

Battery on the device was stated at 5 hours for viewing videos, and up to 10 hours when listening to music. It could connect to a personal computer as a "USB Mass Storage Device" for drag and drop mobility. This player was released on Tuesday, July 12, 2005, and weighed 160 g.

This player, along with a couple AV series players, were sold by Dish Networks under the PocketDish brand as the AV402E.

=== Gmini 402 Camcorder ===
This device included a 1.2 Megapixel camera and had video recording capabilities. It had a 2x digital zoom, and featured 3 resolution modes. Allowing users to choose size over quality, as well as recording directly into MPEG4 in VGA resolution. The Gmini 402 Camcorder was Microsoft Windows and Apple Macintosh compatible, and is recognized instantly as a "Mass Storage Device".It played AVI, WMV, MP3, WMA, DRM WMV, WAV, JPG, BMP and PNG. It featured a 20GB hard drive and had a 2.2 inch 4:3 format colour screen. The device didn't include a speaker, making headphone or earbuds necessary.

This unit was first released on Friday, November 11, 2005, and weighed 160 g.

=== Gmini 500 ===
Just after the release of the AV500, the Archos Gmini 500 was born. This device, along with a lot of Archos' latest devices, has full support for Windows Media's PlaysForSure system which allows users play DRM-restricted music.

This unit is classed more as an "entertainment centre" than an MP3 player, and includes a built-in speaker for listening out aloud. Even though the speaker may not be the best quality, there is also functionality to be able to connect the device up to an existing external Hi-Fi system and listen outward that way.

The player supports all the standard formats, and also contains a photo viewer - images and videos can be viewed on the 4" colour screen within the unit. The Gmini 500 is fully USB 2.0 compliant.

This device was released Tuesday 20 December 2005, and weighs 320 g.

=== Homebrew ===
A firmware exploit discovered by user GliGli provided the possibility for product enhancement by the community of Gmini 400 enthusiasts. The Gmini 400 has become a haven for emulator gaming, with emulators for the Master System, Game Gear, Game Boy, Game Boy Color, and Nintendo Entertainment System. There is also a Sega Genesis emulator for the Gmini 402 named "pico", possibly a port of PicoDrive which has also been ported to other portable devices.

Since then GliGli has ported the applications to the Gmini 402 and 402 Camcorder. They, along with other homebrew applications including Doom, have now been embedded into the fan made operating system named "MediOS" for the Gmini's and other Archos players.

== Portable Audio ==
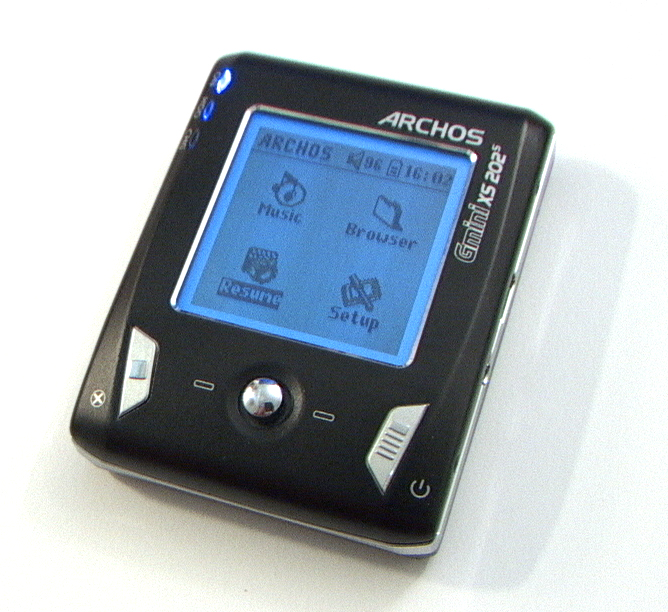
Archos Gmini XS 202s Audio Player.

=== Gmini XS 202 ===
The Gmini XS 202 was a popular model supplied from Archos. This model supported MP3, WMA, protected WMA, and WAV files, and also contains what's known as ARCLibrary, a feature that organizes all digital media on Archos devices. The model also supported gapless playback and Windows Media PlaysForSure standards, so purchased music could be synchronized with the player. The Gmini XS 202 is Microsoft Windows and Apple Macintosh compatible, and uses the USB 2.0 interface to transfer music to its 20 GB built-in hard drive. The player was also ID3 tag compatible.

The Archos Gmini XS 202 was released on Friday, October 28, 2005, and weighed 120 g.

=== Gmini XS 100 ===
The XS 100 group of players features a 1.5" screen, full PlaysForSure capabilities, and supported MP3, WMA, protected WMA, and WAV files. It also featured the ARCLibrary for organizing media files within one's media collection.

Like the above player, the Gmini XS 100 players boasted functionality with Microsoft Windows and Apple Macintosh, and uses the USB 2.0 interface to transfer music quickly. It came in 4 colours, Ice Grey, Volcanic Black, Funky Pink and Techno Blue. With sizes 3 GB or 4 GB.

The Archos Gmini XS 101 was released on Friday, November 12, 2004, and weighed 120 g.

=== Gmini XS 200 ===
Archos' Gmini XS 200 is a previous model to the XS 202, with a monochrome screen, no PlaysForSure support, and a 20 GB hard drive.

The Archos Gmini XS 200 was released on Thursday, October 14, 2004, and weighed 120 g.

=== Gmini 120 ===
This particular model played MP3, WMA and WAV files. It could not play DRM-protected WMA files. Its capacity was 20 GB.

This model also used the ARCLibrary to organize music and media on the device. There was also a browser feature within the unit to enable users to copy, move, and rename files. It had a battery life of 10 hours. The Gmini 120 featured a built-in microphone and a line-in jack, and could record audio straight to MP3 format (112kbs from microphone, 192kbs from line-in jack. Both constant bit rate).

There was a slot in the top of the device that accepted CompactFlash cards. This allowed digital camera images (or any files) to be uploaded to the device, thus reducing the requirement of carrying round many memory cards. The device did not support image viewing, however.

This player was released November 1, 2003, and weighed 244 g.

There was also an optional FM radio attachment available for this player, so users can play and record directly from FM radio.

A version of this player was released as the Archos Gmini SP.

== See also ==
- Archos AV Series
