= PocketDish =

Discontinued satellite media receivers

PocketDish was a discontinued line of media receivers for use with the Dish Network satellite television service. Using a Dish Network DVR receiver, PocketDish users could download television shows and other recorded video content from the DVR onto a PocketDish player. The devices could also download music, videos, and other media to the players from a computer, digital camera, or digital camcorder via a USB cable, or capture video and audio from any standard video or audio outlet when docked. The players were manufactured by Archos and marketed by Dish Network.
