= Archos PMA400 =

Model of personal digital assistant

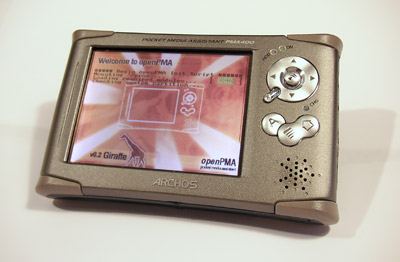
- Released: January 2005
- Discontinued: Yes
- Storage: 20GB, 30GB
- Display: QVGA touchscreen LCD
- Graphics: AVI containing MPEG-4 Simple Profile Video and MP3 or ADPCM; JPEG, GIF, BMP
- Sound: MP3, WMA, Protected WMA, WAV
- Input: Built in microphone, line-in, mic-in, composite video, S-Video
- Camera: (Into AVI, MPEG-4 SP + MP3) from external sources, like cable or satellite television tuners
- Connectivity: USB 2.0, 802.11b Wi-Fi, USB Host, IrDA, 3.5 mm jack for earphones / line-out, built-in speaker, composite video
- Power: Battery: max. 9.5 hours
- Weight: 280 g

The Archos PMA400 is a personal digital assistant (PDA) from Archos, with a hard disk drive and audio and video playback and recording capabilities, so it also functions as a portable media player (PMP). The PMA400 was the most expensive within the line of products that they supplied.

Based on the Linux Qtopia Embedded operating system, the device is more like a personal digital assistant than a normal media player. The PMA400 features the following:

- IR remote
- Software (pre-installed or from online feed)
  - PIM: E-mail client, Agenda, Calendar, Contact Directory
  - Text Viewer and Editor
  - PDF Viewer
  - Opera and Konqueror Embedded web browsers
  - Podcast client
  - Most Qtopia apps that work out of the box are available.
- Games using the Mophun engine

Though it remains Archos's only dedicated PDA, some of its features can be seen on the later 604WiFi including touchscreen and web browsing.

== OpenPMA ==
The original firmware had some major bugs that are now being gradually fixed in an open source firmware by the openPMA project. Added functionality from openPMA are:

- Audio support from openPMA: Ogg vorbis, Musepack
- Many Zaurus packages are compatible or have been adapted
- Access SMB/CIFS network shares using Samba (software) and a GUI frontend
- Act as a SMB/CIFS server allowing other computers on the network to access the internal hard disk
- The MediOS extension originally developed for the AV and Gmini series is available enabling the user to run NES, Sega Mega Drive emulators and Doom interpreter.

== See also ==
- Archos Generation 5
