= Windows CE =

Discontinued embedded operating system by Microsoft

- Wordmark of Windows CE (in versions 4.x and 5.0)
- Developer: Microsoft
- Written in: Assembly, C, C++, C#
- Source model: Closed-source; Source-available (through Shared Source Initiative)
- Initial release: November 16, 1996; 30 years ago
- Final release: 8.0 (Embedded Compact 2013) / June 13, 2013; 13 years ago
- Supported platforms: x86, 32-bit ARM, (SuperH up to 6.0 R2, MIPS and PowerPC were also supported)
- Kernel type: Monolithic
- License: Commercial proprietary software
- Succeeded by: Windows IoT
- Official website: msdn.microsoft.com/embedded

Support status
- Not supported, see § Releases for details.

Windows CE, later known as Windows Embedded CE and Windows Embedded Compact, is a discontinued operating system developed by Microsoft for mobile and embedded devices. Originally targeted solely at handheld computers, Windows CE evolved into a component-based, embedded, real-time operating system. It was part of the Windows Embedded family and served as the software foundation of several products including the Pocket PC, Auto PC, Windows Mobile, Windows Phone 7 and others.

Unlike Windows Embedded Standard, Windows For Embedded Systems, Windows Embedded Industry and Windows IoT, which are based on Windows NT, Windows CE uses a different kernel. Microsoft licensed it to original equipment manufacturers (OEMs), who could modify and create their own user interfaces and experiences, with the operating system providing the technical foundation to do so.

Earlier versions of Windows CE worked on MIPS and SuperH architectures, but in version 7.0 released in 2011—when the product was also renamed to Embedded Compact—support for these were dropped but remained for MIPS II architecture. The final version, Windows Embedded Compact 2013 (version 8.0), released in 2013, only supports x86 and ARM processors with board support package (BSP) directly. It had mainstream support until October 9, 2018, and extended support ended on October 10, 2023; however, license sales for OEMs will continue until 2028.

== Features ==
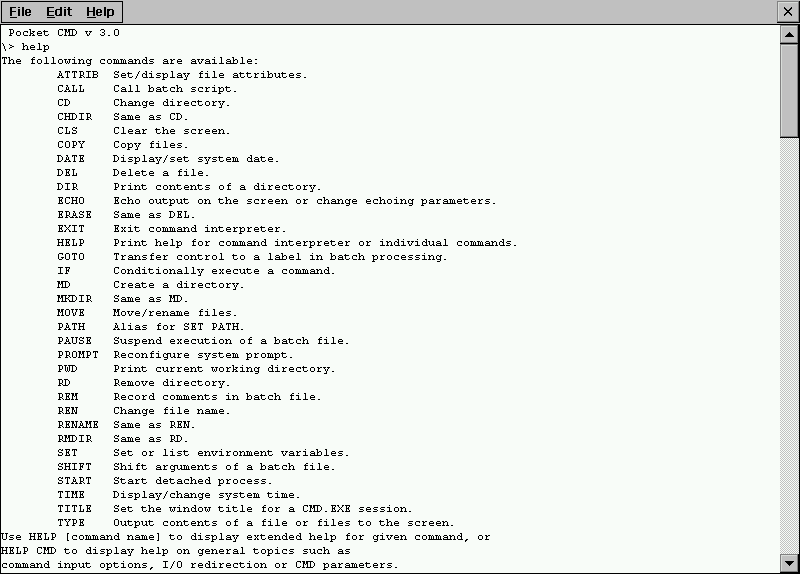
Pocket CMD v 3.0 (cmd.exe) on Windows CE 3.0

Windows CE is optimized for devices that have minimal memory; a Windows CE kernel may run with one megabyte of memory. Devices are often configured without disk storage, and may be configured as a "closed" system that does not allow for end-user extension (for instance, it can be burned into ROM). Windows CE conforms to the definition of a real-time operating system, with a deterministic interrupt latency. From Version 3 and onward, the system supports 256 priority levels and uses priority inheritance for dealing with priority inversion. The fundamental unit of execution is the thread. This helps to simplify the interface and improve execution time.

The first version – known during development under the code name "Pegasus" – featured a Windows-like GUI and a number of Microsoft's popular apps, all trimmed down for smaller storage, memory, and speed of handheld devices.

Many platforms have been based on the core Windows CE operating system, including Microsoft's AutoPC, Pocket PC 2000, Pocket PC 2002, Windows Mobile 2003, Windows Mobile 2003 SE, Windows Mobile 5, Windows Mobile 6, Smartphone 2002, Smartphone 2003, Portable Media Center, Zune, Windows Phone 7 and many industrial devices and embedded systems. Windows CE even powered select games for the Sega Dreamcast and was the operating system of the Gizmondo handheld.

A distinctive feature of Windows CE compared to other Microsoft operating systems is that large parts of it are offered in source code form. First, source code was offered to several vendors, so they could adjust it to their hardware. Then products like Platform Builder (an integrated environment for Windows CE OS image creation and integration, or customized operating system designs based on CE) offered several components in source code form to the general public. However, a number of core components that do not need adaptation to specific hardware environments (other than the CPU family) are still distributed in binary only form.

Unlike Windows NT, whose drivers are based on the Windows Driver Model or Windows Driver Frameworks, Windows CE's drivers are based on the Windows CE Driver Model.

Windows CE uses WCELDR as its second stage boot loader in x86 platforms; or uses EBOOT as its boot loader in ARM platforms. Windows CE uses manufacturer-prebuilt Registry to manage hardware devices. On the startup process, NK.BIN boot image or NK.EXE kernel is loaded by the WCELDR or EBOOT bootloader.

Although Windows Embedded Compact 7 supports multi-core, the NT kernel was used for Windows Phone 8 instead of the CE kernel.

Windows CE 2.11 was the first embedded Windows release to support a console and a Windows CE version of cmd.exe.

== History ==
Logo of Windows CE, from 1996 (versions 1.0 to 3.0)

Logo of Windows Embedded CE, from 2006 (version 6.0)

Logo of Windows Embedded Compact, from 2013 (version 8.0)

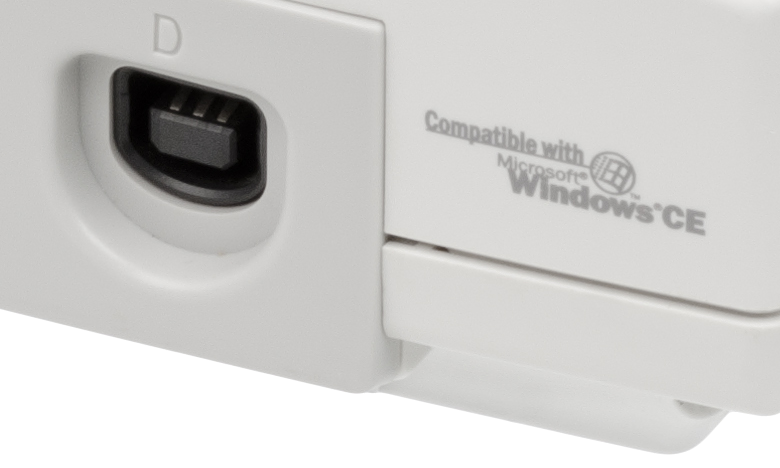
Logo on the Dreamcast: "Compatible with Windows CE"

Windows Embedded Compact was formerly known as Windows CE. According to Microsoft, "CE" is not an explicit acronym for anything, although it implies a number of notions that Windows developers had in mind, such as "compact", "connectable", "compatible", "companion" and "efficient". The name changed once in 2006, with the release of Windows Embedded CE 6.0, and again in 2011, with the release of Windows Embedded Compact 7.

Windows CE was originally announced by Microsoft at the Computer Dealers' Exhibition (COMDEX) in 1996 and was demonstrated on stage by Bill Gates and John McGill. Microsoft had been testing Pegasus in early 1995 and released a strict reference platform to several hardware partners. The devices had to have the following minimum hardware specifications:

- SH3, MIPS 3000 or MIPS 4000 CPU
- Minimum of 4 MB of ROM
- Minimum of 2 MB of RAM with a backup power source, such as a CR2032 coin cell battery
- Powered by two AA batteries
- A physical QWERTY keyboard including Ctrl, Alt, and Shift keys
- A LCD of 480×240 pixels with four shades of gray and two bits per pixel with touchscreen that could be operated by either stylus or finger
- An IrDa transceiver
- Serial port
- PC Card socket
- Built-in speaker

Devices of the time mainly had 480×240 pixel displays with the exception of the Hewlett-Packard 'Palmtop PC' which had a 640×240 display. Each window took over the full display. Navigation was done by tapping or double tapping on an item. A contextual menu was also available by the user pressing the ALT key and tapping on the screen. Windows CE 1.0 did not include a cascading Start menu, unlike Windows 95 and Windows NT 4.0, though Microsoft later released the Windows CE 1.0 Power Toys that included a cascading menu icon that appeared in the system tray; also bundled were several other utilities, most notable were a sound applet for the system tray, enabling the user to quickly mute or unmute their device or adjust the volume and a 'pocket' version of Paint.

The release of Windows CE 2.0 was well received. Microsoft learned its lessons from consumer feedback of Windows CE 1.0 and made many improvements to the operating system. The Start menu was a cascading menu, identical to those found on Windows 95 and Windows NT 4.0. Color screens were also supported and manufacturers raced to release the first color H/PC. The first to market was Hewlett Packard with the HP 620LX. Windows CE 2.0 also supported a broader range of CPU architectures. Programs could be also installed directly in the OS by double clicking on CAB files. Due to the nature of the ROMs that contained the operating system, users were not able to flash their devices with the newer operating system. Instead manufacturers released upgrade ROMs that users had to physically install in their devices, after removing the previous version. This would usually wipe the data on the device and present the user with the setup wizard upon first boot.

In November 1999, it was reported that Microsoft was planning to rename Windows CE to Windows Powered. This name only appeared in brand in Handheld PC 2000 and a build of Windows 2000 Advanced Server for network-attached storage devices (which bears no relation to Windows CE). Various Windows CE 3.0 products announced at CES 2001 were also marketed with the "Windows Powered" umbrella name.

== Development tools ==
=== Visual Studio ===
Microsoft Visual Studio 2012, 2013, and 2015 support apps and Platform Builder development for Windows Embedded Compact 2013.

Microsoft Visual Studio 2008 and earlier support projects for older releases of Windows CE/Windows Mobile, producing executable programs and platform images either as an emulator or attached by cable to an actual mobile device. A mobile device is not necessary to develop a CE program. The .NET Compact Framework supports a subset of the .NET Framework with projects in C#, and Visual Basic (.NET), but not Managed C++. "Managed" apps employing the .NET Compact Framework also require devices with significantly larger memories (8 MB or more) while unmanaged apps can still run successfully on smaller devices. In Visual Studio 2010, the Windows Phone Developer Tools are used as an extension, allowing Windows Phone 7 apps to be designed and tested within Visual Studio.

=== Free Pascal and Lazarus ===
Free Pascal introduced the Windows CE port in Version 2.2.0, targeting ARM and x86 architectures. Later, the Windows CE header files were translated for use with Lazarus, a rapid application development (RAD) software package based on Free Pascal. Windows CE apps are designed and coded in the Lazarus integrated development environment (IDE) and compiled with an appropriate cross compiler.

=== Platform Builder ===
This programming tool is used for building the platform (BSP + Kernel), device drivers (shared source or custom made), and the apps. This is a one stop environment to get the system up and running. One can also use Platform Builder to export a software development kit (SDK) for the target microprocessor (SuperH, x86, MIPS, ARM etc.) to be used with another associated tool set named below.

=== Others ===
- The Embedded Microsoft Visual C++ (eVC) – a tool for development of embedded apps for Windows CE. It can be used standalone using the SDK exported from Platform Builder or using the Platform Builder's Platform Manager connectivity setup.
- CeGcc project provides GNU development tools, such as GNU C, GNU C++ and binutils that target Windows CE; 2 SDKs are available to choose from – a standard Windows CE platform SDK based on MinGW, and a newlib-based SDK which may be easier for porting programs from POSIX systems.
- CodeGear Delphi Prism – runs in Visual Studio, also supports the .NET Compact Framework and thus can be used to develop mobile apps. It employs the Oxygene compiler created by RemObjects Software, which targets .NET, the .NET Compact Framework, and Mono. Its command-line compiler is available free of charge.
- Basic4ppc – a programming language similar to Embedded Visual Basic, targets the .NET Compact Framework and supports Windows CE and Windows Mobile devices.
- GLBasic – a very easy to learn and use BASIC dialect that compiles for many platforms, including Windows CE and Windows Mobile. It can be extended by writing inline C/C++ code.
- LabVIEW – a graphical programming language, supporting many platforms, including Windows CE.
- MortScript – is the semi-standard, extremely lightweight, automation SDK popular with the GPS enthusiasts. Uses the scripts written in its own language, with the syntax being aside to VBScript or JScript.
- AutoHotkey – a port of the open source macro-creation and automation software utility available for Windows CE. It allows the construction of macros and simple GUI apps developed by systems analyst Jonathan Maxian Timkang.

== Relationship to Windows Mobile, Pocket PC, and Smartphone ==
Timeline of Windows CE development

Often Windows CE, Windows Mobile, and Pocket PC are used interchangeably, in part due to their common origin. This practice is not entirely accurate. Windows CE is a modular/componentized operating system that serves as the foundation of several classes of devices. Some of these modules provide subsets of other components' features (e.g. varying levels of windowing support; DCOM vs COM), others which are separate (bitmap or TrueType font support), and others which add additional features to another component. One can buy a kit (the Platform Builder) which contains all these components and the tools with which to develop a custom platform. Apps such as Excel Mobile (formerly Pocket Excel) are not part of this kit. The older Handheld PC version of Pocket Word and several other older apps are included as samples, however.

Windows Mobile is best described as a subset of platforms based on a Windows CE underpinning. Currently, Pocket PC (now called Windows Mobile Classic), Smartphone (Windows Mobile Standard), and Pocket PC Phone Edition (Windows Mobile Professional) are the three main platforms under the Windows Mobile umbrella. Each platform uses different components of Windows CE, plus supplemental features and apps suited for their respective devices.

Pocket PC and Windows Mobile are Microsoft-defined custom platforms for general PDA use, consisting of a Microsoft-defined set of minimum profiles (Professional Edition, Premium Edition) of software and hardware that is supported. The rules for manufacturing a Pocket PC device are stricter than those for producing a custom Windows CE-based platform. The defining characteristics of the Pocket PC are the touchscreen as the primary human interface device and its extremely portable size.

CE 3.0 is the basis for Pocket PC 2000 and Pocket PC 2002. A successor to CE 3.0 is CE.net. "PocketPC [is] a separate layer of code on top of the core Windows CE OS... Pocket PC is based on Windows CE, but it's a different offering." And licensees of Pocket PC are forbidden to modify the WinCE part.

The Smartphone platform is a feature-rich OS and interface for cellular phone handsets. SmartPhone offers productivity features to business users, such as email, and multimedia abilities for consumers. The SmartPhone interface relies heavily on joystick navigation and PhonePad input. Devices running SmartPhone do not include a touchscreen interface. SmartPhone devices generally resemble other cellular handset form factors, whereas most Phone Edition devices use a PDA form factor with a larger display.

== Releases ==
Version	Name	Released	Support status	Changes
1.0	Windows CE 1.0	November 16, 1996	Unsupported as of December 31, 2001.	Codename "Pegasus" (core) and "Alder" (tools).: Devices named "handheld PC" (H/PC); 4 MB ROM minimum; 2 MB RAM minimum
1.01	Windows CE 1.0a	1997	Unsupported as of December 31, 2001.	Codename "Pegasus" (core), "Alder" (tools) or unknown.: Added Japanese language support.
2.0	Windows CE 2.0	October 13, 1997	Unsupported as of before September 30, 2002. Mainstream support ended before September 30, 2003 and extended support ended before September 30, 2005.	Codenamed may be "Birch" (core), "Buzzsaw" (tools).: Devices named "Palm-size PC" (PsPC); Real-time deterministic task scheduling; Architectures: ARM, MIPS, PowerPC, StrongARM, SuperH and x86; 32-bit color screens; SSL 2.0 and SSL 3.0
2.01	Windows CE 2.01	1998	Unsupported as of before September 30, 2002. Mainstream support ended before September 30, 2003 and extended support ended before September 30, 2005.	Codename might be "Birch" (core), "Buzzsaw" (tools).
2.02	Windows CE 2.02	1998	Unsupported as of before September 30, 2002. Mainstream support ended before September 30, 2003.	Codename might be "Birch" (core), "Buzzsaw" (tools).
2.10	Windows CE 2.10	1998	Unsupported as of before September 30, 2002. Mainstream support ended before September 30, 2003	Codename might be "Birch" (core), "Buzzsaw" (tools).
2.11	Windows CE 2.11	1999	Unsupported as of September 30, 2002. Mainstream support ended on September 30, 2003 and extended support ended on September 30, 2005 for Windows CE 2.12.	Codename might be "Birch" (core), "Buzzsaw" (tools).: (Palm-Size PC 1.2) – based on Windows CE H/PC 2.11 kernel, removed Pocket Office.
2.12	Windows CE 2.12	1999	Unsupported as of September 30, 2005. Mainstream support ended on September 30, 2003 and extended support ended on September 30, 2005	Codename might be "Birch" (core), "Buzzsaw" (tools).
3.0	Windows CE 3.0	June 15, 2000	Mainstream support ended on September 30, 2005 and extended support ended on October 9, 2007.	Codenamed "Cedar" (core), "Chainsaw" (tools) and "Galileo".: Major recode that made CE hard real time down to the microsecond level; Base for the Pocket PC 2000, Handheld PC 2000, Pocket PC 2002 and Smartphone 2002; Priority levels were increased from 8 to 256; Object store was increased from 65,536 to 4.19 million allowed objects; Restricted access to critical APIs or restricting write access to parts of the registry
4.0	Windows CE 4.0	January 7, 2002	Mainstream support ended on July 10, 2007 and extended support ended on July 10, 2012.	Codenamed "Talisker" (whiskey).: Integrated with .NET Compact Framework; Driver structure changed greatly, new features added; Flash memory and Bluetooth support; HID devices and standardized keyboards support; TLS 1.0 (SSL 3.1), IPsec L2TP VPN, or Kerberos; Pocket Office was reduced to WordPad; Separation to two editions – Core (only shell) and Professional (with Microsoft Accessories); In addition to the older PocketIE browser, Internet Explorer Mobile was available with near 100% page compatibility to its IE 5.5 desktop cousin.
4.1	Windows CE 4.1	2002	Mainstream support ended on January 8, 2008 and extended support ended on January 8, 2013.	Codenamed "Jameson" (whiskey).
4.2	Windows CE 4.2	2003	Mainstream support ended on July 8, 2008 and extended support ended on July 9, 2013.	Codenamed "McKendric" (whiskey).: a new shell was provided with Internet Explorer integration; Base for Windows Mobile 2003
5.0	Windows CE 5.x	August 2004	Mainstream support ended on October 13, 2009 and extended support ended on October 14, 2014.	Adds many new features. Codenamed "Macallan": Added automatic reporting for manufacturers; Direct3D Mobile, a COM-based version of Windows XP's DirectX multimedia API; DirectDraw for 2D graphics and DirectShow for camera and video digitisation support; Remote Desktop Protocol (RDP) support; The "Pro" version includes the Internet Explorer browser and Windows Media Player 9.
6.0	Windows Embedded CE 6.0	September 2006	Mainstream support ended on April 9, 2013, and extended support ended on April 10, 2018.	Codenamed "Yamazaki".: Process address space is increased from 32 MB to 2 GB; each process now has its own virtual memory map (all processes shared a VM map in CE 5.0); Number of processes has been increased from 32 to 32,768; User mode and kernel mode device drivers are possible; 512 MB physically managed memory; Device.exe, filesys.exe, GWES.exe have been moved to Kernel mode; Cellcore; SetKMode and set process permissions no longer possible; System call performance improved; The platform builder requires Microsoft Visual Studio 2005 with Service Pack 1 installed.
7.0	Windows Embedded Compact 7	March 2011	Mainstream support ended on April 12, 2016 and extended support ended on April 13, 2021.	Support for x86, SH (automotive only) and ARM.; Multi-core CPU support (SMP).; Wi-Fi Positioning System.; Bluetooth 3.0 + HS support.; Digital Living Network Alliance (DLNA).; DRM technology.; Media Transfer Protocol.; Windows Phone 7 IE with Flash 10.1 support.; NDIS 6.1 support.; UX C++ XAML API using technologies like Windows Presentation Foundation and Silverlight for attractive and functional user interfaces.; Modernized graphics based on OpenGL ES 2.0.; Advanced touch and gesture input.; Kernel support for 3 GB physical RAM and supports ARMv7 assembly.; The platform builder requires Microsoft Visual Studio 2008 with Service Pack 1 installed.
8.0	Windows Embedded Compact 2013	June 2013	Mainstream support ended on October 9, 2018, and extended support ended on October 10, 2023.	DHCPv6 client with stateful/stateless address configuration.; L2TP/IPsec over IPv6 for VPN connectivity.; Snapshot boot.; Improved XAML data binding and Expression Blend support.; OOM Model improvements from 7.; HTML help viewer added.; The previously default desktop shell has been eliminated.; The platform builder requires Microsoft Visual Studio 2012 or above installed.

== See also ==
- ActiveSync
- Handheld PC
- Handheld PC Explorer
- List of Windows CE Devices
- Microsoft Kin
- Modular Windows
- Palm-size PC
- Pocket PC
- Portable Media Center
- Tablet PC
- Windows Phone
- Zune HD
- Dreamcast
- Windows Mobile
