= Docomo PRIME series F-04B =

2010 mobile phone sold in Japan

docomo PRIME series F-04B
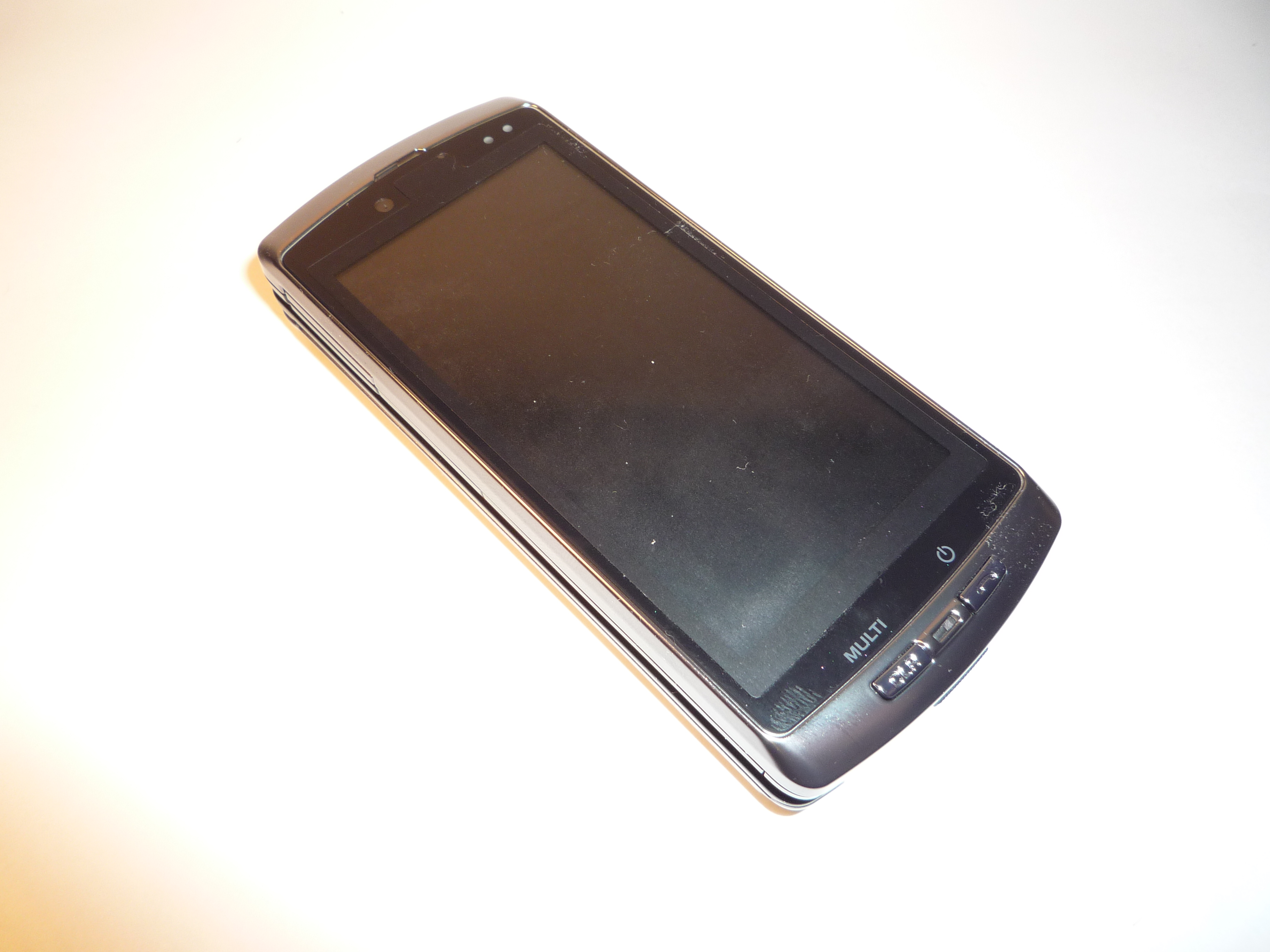
- F-04B when not slid open
- Brand: NTT Docomo
- Manufacturer: Fujitsu
- Series: docomo PRIME series
- First released: March 26, 2010; 16 years ago
- Compatible networks: 3G: FOMA (W-CDMA, HSDPA); 2G: GSM (EDGE); Frequencies: 3G: 800 MHz, 850 MHz, 1.7 GHz, 2 GHz; 2G: 900 MHz, 1800 MHz, 1900 MHz
- Form factor: Separable, slider, touchscreen
- Colors: White; Black; Dark Silver; Mat Black
- Dimensions: Joined: 114 mm (4.5 in) H 51 mm (2.0 in) W 20 mm (0.79 in) D Display unit: 114 mm (4.5 in) H 51 mm (2.0 in) W 9.8 mm (0.39 in) D Key unit: 114 mm (4.5 in) H 51 mm (2.0 in) W 10.4 mm (0.41 in) D
- Weight: Joined: 169 g (6.0 oz); Display unit: 87 g (3.1 oz); Key unit: 82 g (2.9 oz)
- Operating system: Symbian OS + MOAP(S)
- CPU: SH-Mobile G3
- Removable storage: microSD (up to 2 GB), microSDHC (up to 16 GB)
- Rear camera: 12.2 MP CMOS, autofocus, image stabilization, face recognition
- Front camera: 0.32 MP CMOS
- Display: 3.4 in (86 mm) wide TFT LCD, 480×960 pixels, 16,777,216 colors
- Model: F-04B

The docomo PRIME series F-04B is a 3rd generation mobile phone (FOMA) terminal developed by Fujitsu for NTT Docomo. It is a device in the docomo PRIME series.

== Overview ==
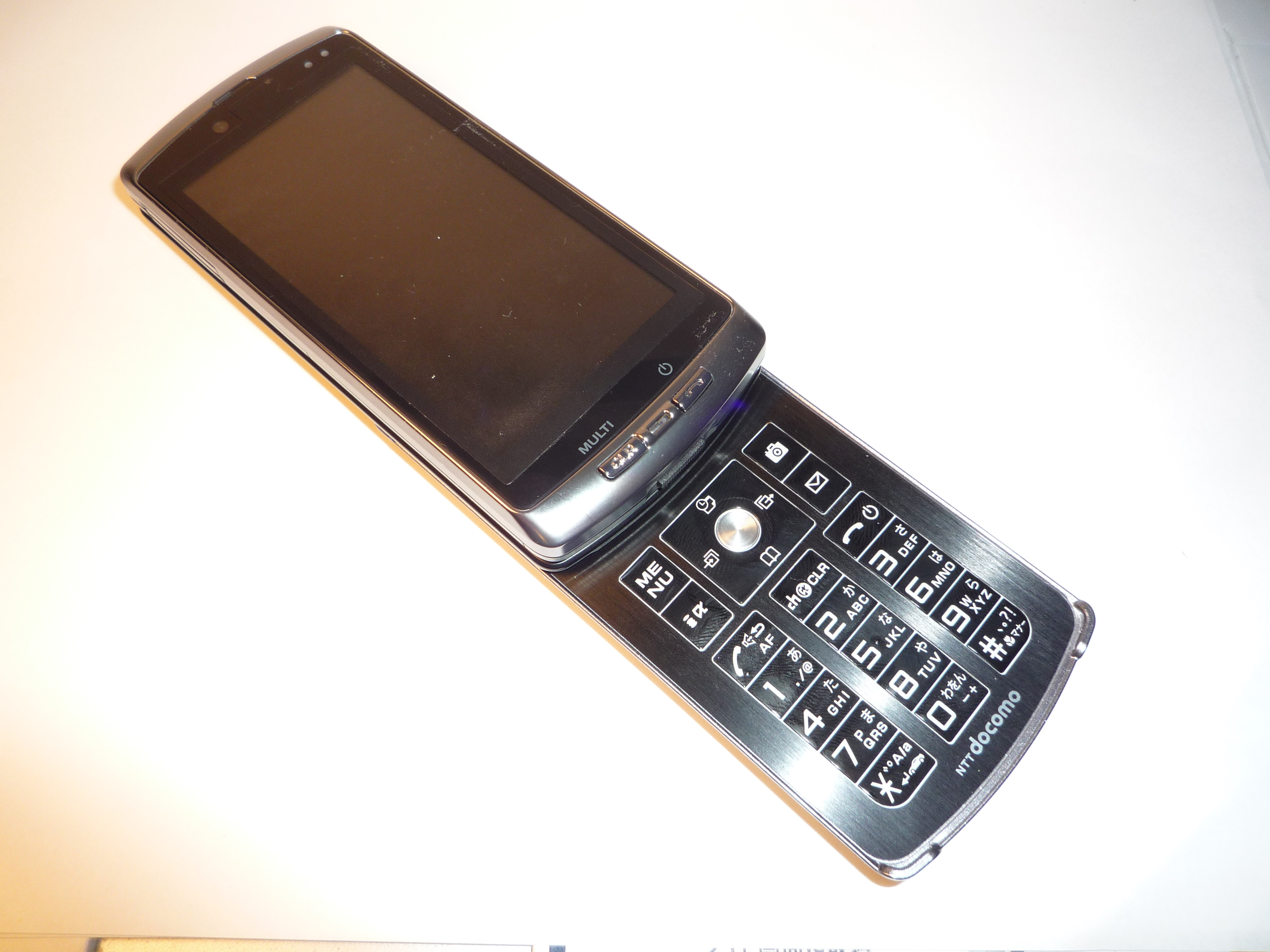
Front panel, keypad slid out

It is the world's first model to propose a new style of use with a separable style, allowing the display unit and the dial key unit to be detached from each other. The development originated from a prototype model exhibited for reference at CEATEC JAPAN 2008 in September 2008, which attached and detached via strong magnets and could transform between a standard clamshell and a smartphone layout. The product was commercialized approximately one and a half years after the public display of the prototype.

== Features ==
Like the F-09A, the main display features a 3.4-inch wide LCD with a resolution of 480×960 pixels, inheriting its touchscreen UI. All primary mobile phone functions are housed in the display unit, aggregating the camera, FeliCa, and communication terminals alongside the screen. Depending on the usage style, the device can be used with only the display unit. The key unit features a QWERTY keyboard in addition to the numeric keypad. Both the display and key units contain batteries of the same capacity.

In the docked style, where the display unit and key unit are combined, they connect via physical terminals. In the separated style, they connect via Bluetooth. This allows users to talk on the phone using the key unit while using various functions on the display unit, such as email, i-mode, or the camera. It also allows playing games using the directional pad like a home video game controller. Furthermore, the key unit can function like a remote control, enabling channel changes for 1Seg TV or acting as a remote shutter for the camera.

Since the IC card slot is located on the back of the display unit, it is recommended to detach the key unit when using contactless IC cards or performing iC communications. However, Fujitsu states that it can still be used while the key unit is attached.

In standard docked mode, it is used as a slide device, but when detached while closed, the dial key portion functions as a QWERTY keyboard, enabling two-handed text input. Expanding on the text input functions of the F-09A, it adopts Fujitsu's proprietary "Free Touch Writing" handwriting recognition, allowing handwriting input of Kanji and emoji. Free Touch Writing is also included on the F-01B.

Similar to the concurrently announced F-01B and F-03B, the main camera features a 28mm wide-angle lens paired with a 12.2-megapixel CMOS sensor. It continues to use the "Mobile Milbeaut" image processing engine featured in successive Fujitsu phones. It supports up to 6.3x "Super Digital Zoom" with minimal quality loss, a "Personal Recognition Shooting Function" that prioritizes registered faces, a "Smile Finder" that identifies smiling expressions, and high-sensitivity shooting equivalent to up to ISO 25600. Shooting assistance features include "Tracking Focus" to continuously maintain focus on a moving subject, automatic scene recognition, local contrast correction, and "Triple Regard." The sub-camera features an approximately 320,000-pixel CMOS sensor. To use the main camera when the key unit is attached, the slider must be opened first.

Compared to the F-01B released around the same time, it does not support fingerprint authentication or waterproofing.

In terms of audio, it features Dolby Mobile, enabling 5.1-channel surround sound for 1Seg TV and music playback. Programs recorded on a Blu-ray recorder can also be transferred to a microSD card and viewed in high quality.

It also includes the "Uta Moji" feature, which displays lyrics during music playback.

In addition, it offers health management functions, including an exercise counter (activity meter) and walking checker (pedometer). Measurement results from Tanita body composition monitors can be managed on the F-04B and synced with Tanita's health support web service, "Karada Karte."

A parent-child mode is included, allowing restrictions to be set for individual features such as email, outgoing calls, and i-mode. Parents can set an admin PIN distinct from the child's password to prevent unauthorized setting changes by children.

Included among the accessories is a sample "Stand Strap" that functions as a lanyard and serves as a stand for the display unit when detached.

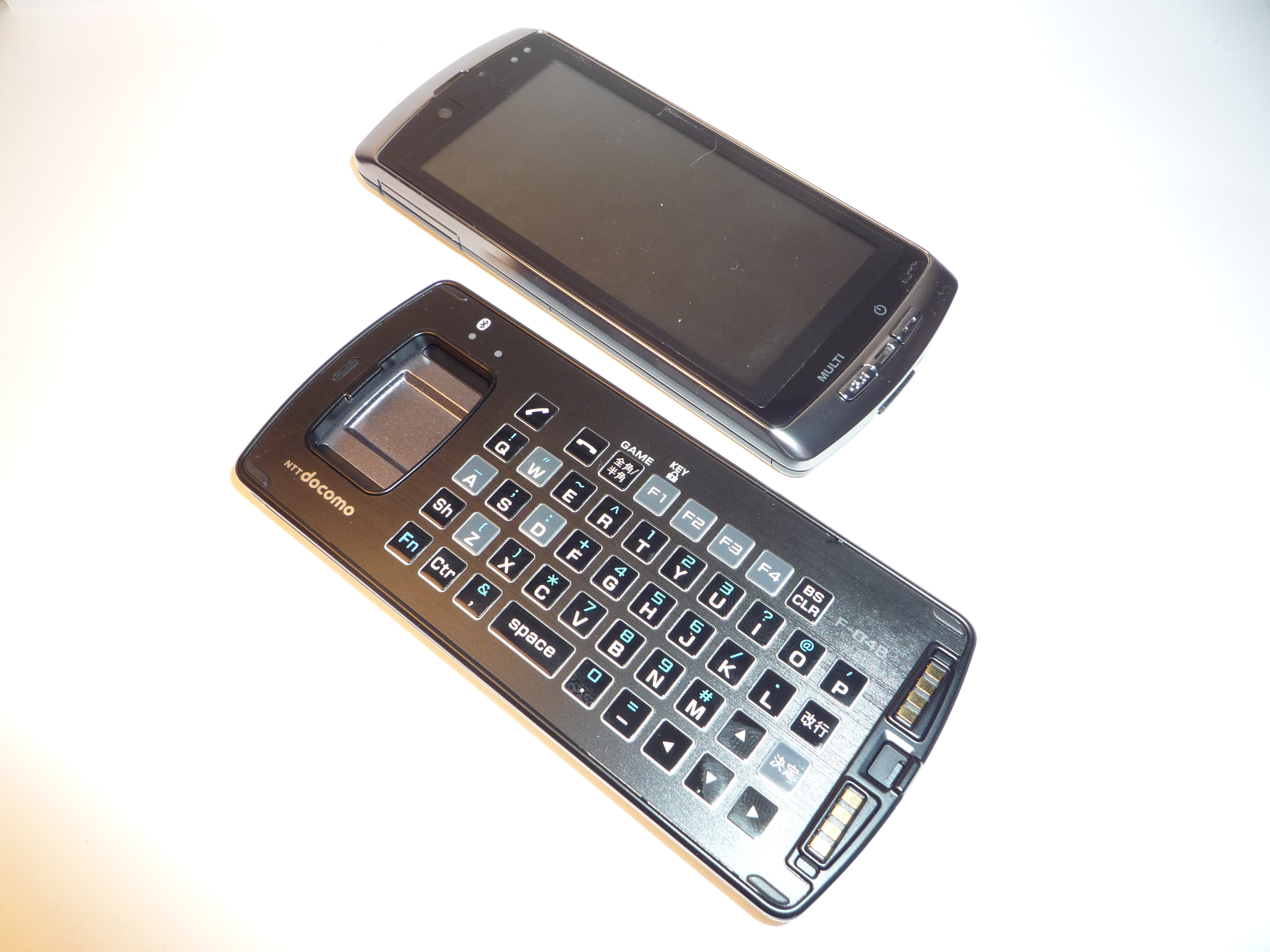
Separated (unslid)

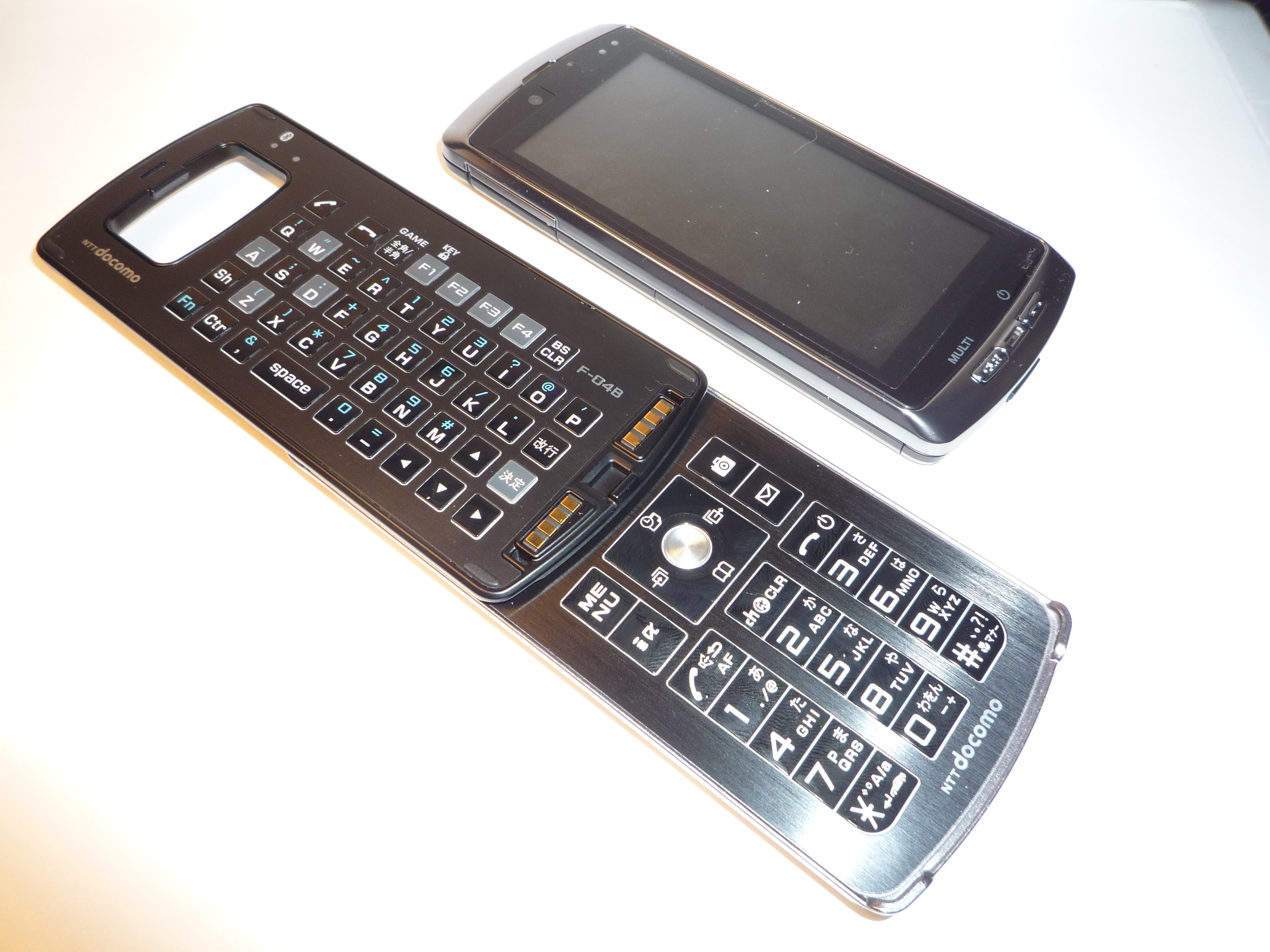
Separated (slid)

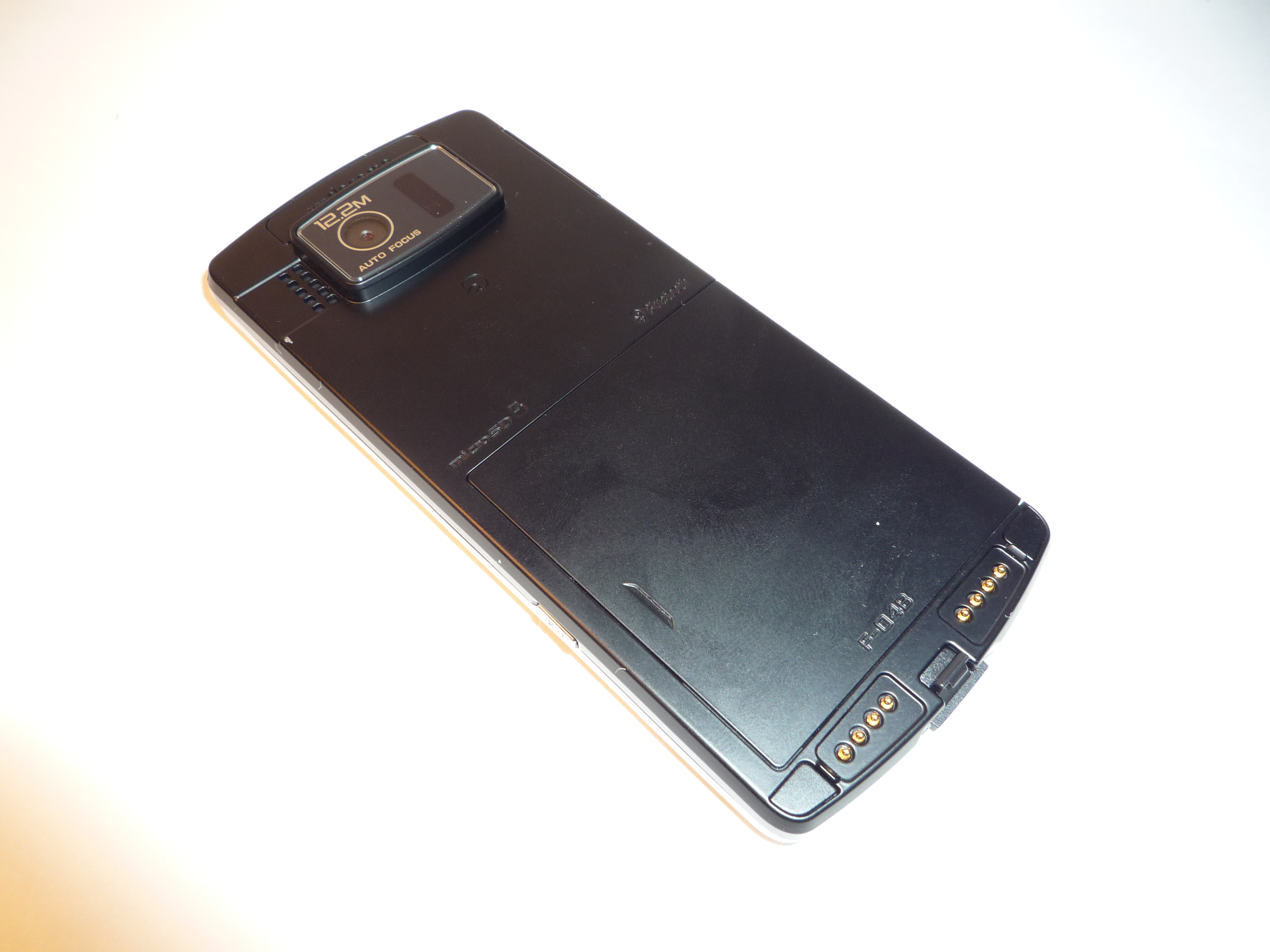
Rear view (without key unit)

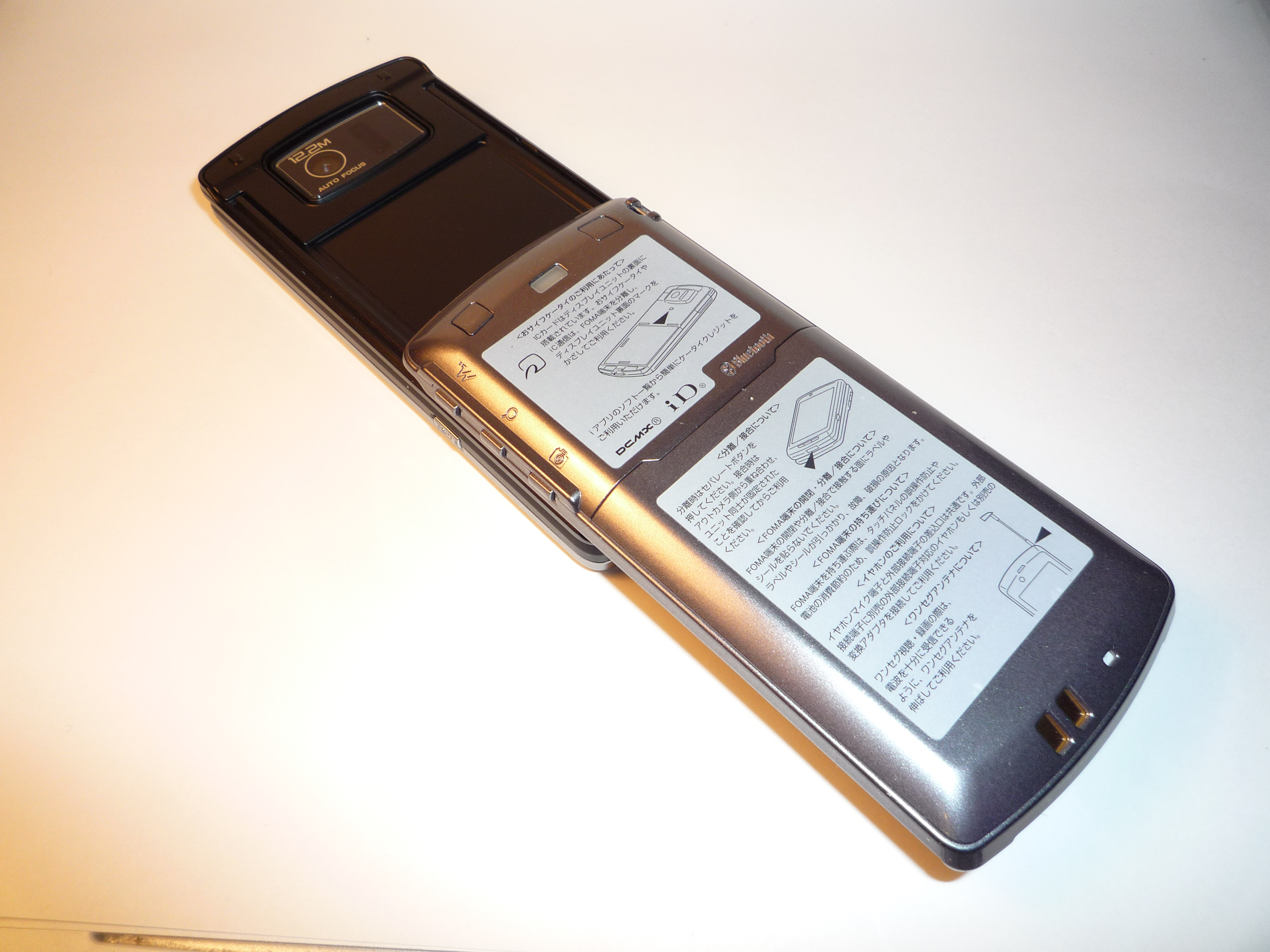
Rear view (with key unit)

== Projector ==
By connecting the Projector Unit F01 to the display unit, all content that can be displayed on the screen—such as 1Seg TV, photos, videos, games, and PC documents (PDF, Microsoft Word, Excel, PowerPoint)—can be projected on a large screen. It can also project input from connected digital cameras or computers, and two people can play head-to-head games while viewing the projected display.

When the display unit and projector unit are physically attached, all content on the phone can be projected. When connected via Bluetooth, projecting 1Seg, videos, and i-αppli applications is not supported.

It weighs 99g and features composite/D-Sub 15 pin connectors for external input

== Supported services ==
Key Supported Services
Touchscreen	FOMA High-Speed 7.2 Mbps	Bluetooth	DCMX / Osaifu-Keitai					
i-αppli Online / Map App	Intuitive Game / Mega i-αppli	i-Widget	Machi-Chara / i-concier					
~~Home U~~ / Pocket U	GPS / Auto GPS / Keitai-Oshagashi	Deco-mail / Deco-mail Emoji / Deco-mail Anime	i-Channel					
Chaku-moji	Videophone / Chara-den	Keitai Data Storage Service	Full Browser	-	Omakase Lock / ~~Biometric Authentication~~	i-mode content transfer to external memory / Batch user data backup	Toruca	iC Communication / iC Transfer Service
Kisekae Tool / Direct Menu	Barcode Reader / ~~Business Card Reader~~	2in1	Area Mail / Automatic Software Update					
GSM / 3G Roaming (WORLD WING)	Chaku-uta Full / Uta-Houdai	Music & Video Channel / Video Clip	Digital Audio Player (WMA) (AAC)					

== History ==
- November 10, 2009 – Announcement of development for F-01B, F-02B, F-03B, F-04B, L-01B, L-02B, L-03B, N-01B, N-02B, N-03B, P-01B, P-02B, P-03B, SH-01B, SH-02B, SH-03B, SH-04B, SH-05B, and SC-01B.
- December 17, 2009 – Passed Japan Approval Institute for Telecommunications Equipment (JATE) certification (Approval number: AD09-0442001).
- January 8, 2010 – Passed Technical Conformity Certification (TELEC) (Certificates: 001MWAA1284, 001WWDA1321, 001XYAA1653 for "F-04B"; 001WWDA1322 for "F-04B-S"; 001WWDA1323 for "Projector Unit F-01").
- January 22, 2010 – Passed Federal Communications Commission (FCC) certification.
- February 26, 2010 – Release date posted on Digimono Station editors' blog (later revised on March 2 to end of March).
- March 12, 2010 – Detailed information regarding the Projector Unit posted on Fujitsu's official website.
- March 13, 2010 – The March 20 information on Rakuten Ichiba (Moba@Spa) was removed along with the page.
- March 19, 2010 – Release date and price listed on Mobile Gadget.
- March 20, 2010 – Pre-orders reopened on Rakuten Ichiba (Moba@Spa).
- March 23, 2010 – Official release date announced by Docomo.
- March 26, 2010 – Device released.
- April 22, 2010 – Release date for Projector Unit F01 announced by Docomo.
- April 30, 2010 – Projector Unit F01 released.
- August 11, 2010 – Docomo announced new colors Mat Black and Dark Silver to be released in September.
- September 2, 2010 – Release date for new colors announced by Docomo.
- September 10, 2010 – New colors Mat Black and Dark Silver released.

== Known issues ==
On June 8, 2010, the first software update released. An issue was fixed where the charging completion chime would sound every minute after the key unit finished charging when charged on the desktop cradle.

On May 7, 2012, the software update released to fix the following issue:

- Setting a downloaded image as a menu icon could cause display errors after restarting the device.
