= EVB =

EVB may refer to:

- Eisenbahnen und Verkehrsbetriebe Elbe-Weser, a German rail and bus company
- Eleanor Vere Boyle (1825–1916), Scottish artist
- Electric-vehicle battery
- Embedded Visual Basic
- Empirical valence bond
- Evaluation board
- New Smyrna Beach Municipal Airport in Florida, United States
- Public Eye (organization) (German: Erklärung von Bern), a Swiss sustainability organization
