= Windows Embedded Compact 7 =

2011 release of the Windows Embedded CE operating system

- Version of the Windows CE operating system

- Windows Embedded Compact 7.0 desktop
- Developer: Microsoft
- Source model: Closed-source; Source-available (through Shared Source Initiative)
- Released to manufacturing: March 1, 2011; 15 years ago
- Kernel type: Monolithic kernel
- License: Commercial proprietary software
- Preceded by: Windows Embedded CE 6.0
- Succeeded by: Windows Embedded Compact 2013
- Official website: www.microsoft.com/windowsembedded/en-us/campaigns/compact7/

Support status
- Mainstream: Ended on April 12, 2016
- Extended: Ended on April 13, 2021

A concept UI used to display the graphical capabilities of Windows Embedded Compact 7

Windows Embedded Compact 7 (formerly known as Windows Embedded CE 7.0) is the seventh major release of the Windows Embedded CE operating system developed by Microsoft, released on March 1, 2011. Windows Embedded Compact 7 is a real-time OS, separate from the Windows NT line, and is designed to target enterprise-specific tools such as industrial controllers and consumer electronics devices such as digital cameras, GPS systems and also automotive infotainment systems. Windows Embedded Compact is designed to run on multiple CPU architectures and supports x86, SH (automotive only) and ARM.

During development, a Microsoft employee working in this division claimed that Microsoft was working hard on this release and that it shares the underlying kernel with Windows Phone. Microsoft officially confirmed this and said that Windows Phone 7 is based on Windows Embedded CE 6.0 R3 with some features borrowed from Windows Embedded Compact 7, thus making it a hybrid solution.

As with Windows Embedded CE 6.0, the platform builder for Windows Embedded Compact 7 is not a stand-alone product, but is implemented as plug-in for Microsoft Visual Studio - the version required is Visual Studio 2008 with Service Pack 1 installed.

== New features ==
Windows Embedded Compact 7 contains these features:

- Silverlight for Windows Embedded: Allows developers to develop application and user interfaces in Silverlight using Microsoft Expression Blend
- Internet Explorer for Windows Embedded: A web browser similar to that of Windows Phone 7 with integrated Adobe Flash v10.1 support
- Touch support: Windows Embedded Compact 7 recognizes touch and gesture input types
- CPU support: Works on dual core CPUs in symmetric multiprocessing mode
- Platform support: Runs on x86, SH4 (automotive only) MIPS and ARMv7 platforms
- Media playback: Supports Digital Living Network Alliance (DLNA) and Media Transfer Protocol (MTP)
- Networking: Now includes NDIS 6.1 and supports Bluetooth 2.1 EDR
