= Embedded Visual Basic =

Embedded Visual Basic or eVB, is an implementation of Microsoft Visual Basic which is geared towards generating programmes for embedded systems such as PDAs, cellular telephones, pocket computers and other programmable electronic systems and devices, generally for use under Windows CE. The tools themselves run on desktop operating systems such as Windows 98, Windows NT, Windows XP and subsequent. The tools are also capable of compiling executables for Windows NT Embedded as well.

Embedded Visual Basic is available from Microsoft, as are other such tools including Embedded Visual C++ (eVC++), which is discussed in the Wikipedia article about Microsoft Visual C++, and Embedded Visual J++ (eVJ++), as well as other development tools and a relational database system for Windows CE (a de facto Visual FoxPro replacement). A centrally important Windows CE-related tool is ActiveSync, which allows access of a device from a desktop computer as well as Control Panel functionality (e.g. Install & Uninstall Programmes). Amongst other tools is a version of RegEdit for Windows CE.

The implementations of these tools provide objects and components which can be used to write programmes which automate Microsoft Office's Pocket versions, which would be the one way to get scripting and macro capability for the Pocket office suite. There is not an Embedded Visual InterDev version, nor have MSDN or Visual Source Safe been ported to Windows CE. The other means of obtaining Visual Basic functionality under Windows CE is to install the Windows Script Host implementation which is a non-default install available from the installation CD-ROM.

Version 3 of the embedded Visual Basic, Visual J++, and Visual C++ tools approximate the language and implementation of Visual Basic 6.0, Visual J++ 6.0, and Visual C++ 6.0. The CD-Roms for installation of these tools have been provided for free from Microsoft. A further update of the latter, version 4.5, is also available. Programming tools for .NET systems are also produced by Microsoft. One Basic development tool which can be run on board the Windows CE machines themselves is the third-party NS BASIC.
