= Windows Embedded CE 6.0 =

Embedded operating system by Microsoft released in 2006

- Version of the Windows CE operating system
- Screenshot of Windows Embedded CE 6.0
- Developer: Microsoft
- Source model: Closed-source; Source-available (through Shared Source Initiative)
- Released to manufacturing: November 1, 2006
- Latest release: 6.0 R3 / September 22, 2009
- Kernel type: Monolithic kernel
- License: Commercial software
- Preceded by: Windows CE 5.2
- Succeeded by: Windows Embedded Compact 7
- Official website: www.microsoft.com/windows/embedded/default.mspx

Support status
- Mainstream: Ended on April 9, 2013
- Extended: Ended on April 10, 2018

Windows Embedded CE 6.0 (codenamed "Yamazaki") is the sixth major release of the Microsoft Windows CE embedded operating system targeted to enterprise-specific tools such as industrial controllers and consumer electronics devices like digital cameras. CE 6.0 features a kernel that supports 32,768 processes, up from the 32-process limit of prior versions. Each process receives 2 GB of virtual address space, up from 32 MB. Windows Embedded CE is commonly used in supermarket self-checkouts and cars as a display. Windows Embedded CE is a background system on most devices that have it.

Windows Embedded CE 6.0 was released on November 1, 2006, and includes partial source code. The OS serves as the basis for the Zune HD portable media player. Windows Mobile 6.5 is based on Windows CE 5.2. Windows Phone 7, the first major release of the Windows Phone operating system, is based on Windows Embedded CE 6.0 R3; although Windows Phone 7 is also using Windows Embedded Compact 7 features.

== New features ==
- Some system components (such as filesystem, GWES (graphics, windowing, events server), device driver manager) have been moved to the kernel space.
- The system components which now run in kernel have been converted from EXEs to DLLs, which get loaded into kernel space.
- New virtual memory model. The lower 2 GB is the process VM space and is private per process. The upper 2 GB is the kernel VM space.
- New device driver model that supports both user mode and kernel mode drivers.
- The 32 process limit has been raised to 32,768 processes.
- The 32 megabyte virtual memory limit has been raised to the total virtual memory; up to 2 GB of private VM is available per process.
- The Platform Builder IDE is integrated into Microsoft Visual Studio 2005 as plugin (thus forcing the client to obtain Microsoft Visual Studio 2005 also), allowing one development environment for both platform and application development.
- Read-only support for UDF 2.5 filesystem.
- Support for Microsoft's exFAT filesystem.
- 802.11i (WPA2) and 802.11e (QoS) wireless standards, and multiple radio support.
- CE 6.0 is compatible with x86, ARM, SH4 (only up to R2) and MIPS based processor architectures.
- New Cellcore components to enable devices to easily make data connections and initiate voice calls through cellular networks.

== New features in R3 ==
Windows Embedded CE 6.0 R3 was finalized in September 2009 for OEMs and serves as the base platform for the Zune HD and Windows Phone 7. CE 6.0 R3 includes the following new features and abilities:

Silverlight for Windows Embedded	Abilities brought to Windows Embedded CE to create rich applications and user interfaces
Internet Explorer Embedded	Has multi-touch panning and zooming abilities and a customizable interface to optimize the browsing experience on devices
Flash Lite	Browser plug in to render rich media websites; not available in Windows Phone 7
Touch and Gesture	Plug-in engine to enable natural input abilities such as four-point multi-touch, advanced gestures and complex 3D animations
Connection Manager	Infrastructure technology to manage multiple network interfaces on the device
Microsoft Office and PDF viewers	Applications to render Microsoft Office Word, PowerPoint, Excel and Adobe PDF content on the device

These features listed here are not all specific to Windows Phone 7 or the Zune HD.
