= Windows IoT =

Embedded operating system by Microsoft

- Windows Embedded 8 showing "Hotel Systems" panel, Metro-style app
- Developer: Microsoft
- OS family: Microsoft Windows
- Source model: Closed-source; Source-available (through Shared Source Initiative)
- Kernel type: Hybrid kernel
- License: Commercial proprietary software
- Official website: developer.microsoft.com/en-us/windows/iot/

Support status
- IoT: All non-LTSC editions of Windows 10 IoT Enterprise are out of support. Paid ESU available up to 3 years, extended support ends on October 11, 2028. Mainstream support until January 12, 2027 and extended support until January 13, 2032 for Windows 10 IoT Enterprise LTSC. Mainstream support until October 9, 2029, and extended support until October 10, 2034 for Windows 11 IoT Enterprise LTSC. Embedded: All editions unsupported.

'Windows IoT (formerly known as Windows Embedded), is a family of operating systems from Microsoft designed for use in embedded systems. Microsoft has three different sub families of operating systems for embedded devices targeting a wide market, ranging from small-footprint, real-time devices to point of sale (POS) devices like kiosks. Windows Embedded operating systems are available to original equipment manufacturers (OEMs), who make it available to end users preloaded with their hardware, in addition to volume license customers in some cases.

In April 2018, Microsoft released Azure Sphere, another operating system designed for IoT applications running on the Linux kernel.

== The IoT family ==
Microsoft rebranded "Windows Embedded" to "Windows IoT" starting with the release of embedded editions of Windows 10.

=== Enterprise ===
Windows IoT Enterprise is a binary equivalent version of Windows 10 and 11 Enterprise designed for use in embedded applications. It replaces both Embedded Industry and Embedded Standard, as well as Embedded FES (known simply as "Windows Embedded" since Windows 8/8.1). It functions in the same manner, including all of its components and features, but is licensed exclusively for use in embedded devices. Plain unlabeled, Retail/Thin Client, Tablet, and Small Tablet SKUs are available, again differing only in licensing.

Later versions added a minor change that allows the use of smaller storage devices, with the possibility of more changes being made in the future. In Windows 10 IoT Enterprise, version 21H2, additional "Soft Real-Time" features (CPU isolation, ISR pinning, mutex priority inheritance, RT thread priority levels) were added. In addition, starting with the LTSC edition of version 21H2, Windows Enterprise LTSC has five less years of security updates compared to the IoT Enterprise edition.

=== Mobile ===
Windows 10 IoT Mobile, also known as Windows 10 IoT Mobile Enterprise, is a binary equivalent of Windows 10 Mobile Enterprise that functions exactly the same, except that it is licensed for IoT applications. It is unsupported as of January 14, 2020.

=== Core ===
Windows 10 IoT Core is a cut-down version of Windows 10 that is considered by some to be the successor to Windows Embedded Compact, however it maintains very little compatibility with it. Optimized for smaller and lower-cost industry devices, it is also provided free of charge for use in devices like the Raspberry Pi for hobbyist use.

==== Core Pro ====
Windows 10 IoT Core Pro provides the ability to defer and control updates and is licensed only via distributors; it is otherwise identical to the normal IoT Core edition.

=== Server ===
Windows Server IoT 2019 is a full, binary equivalent version of Windows Server 2019, intended to aggregate data from many 'things'. Like the IoT Enterprise variants, it remains identical in behavior to its regularly licensed counterpart, but differs only in licensing terms. It also is offered in both LTSC and SAC options.

== Embedded family ==
=== Embedded Compact ===
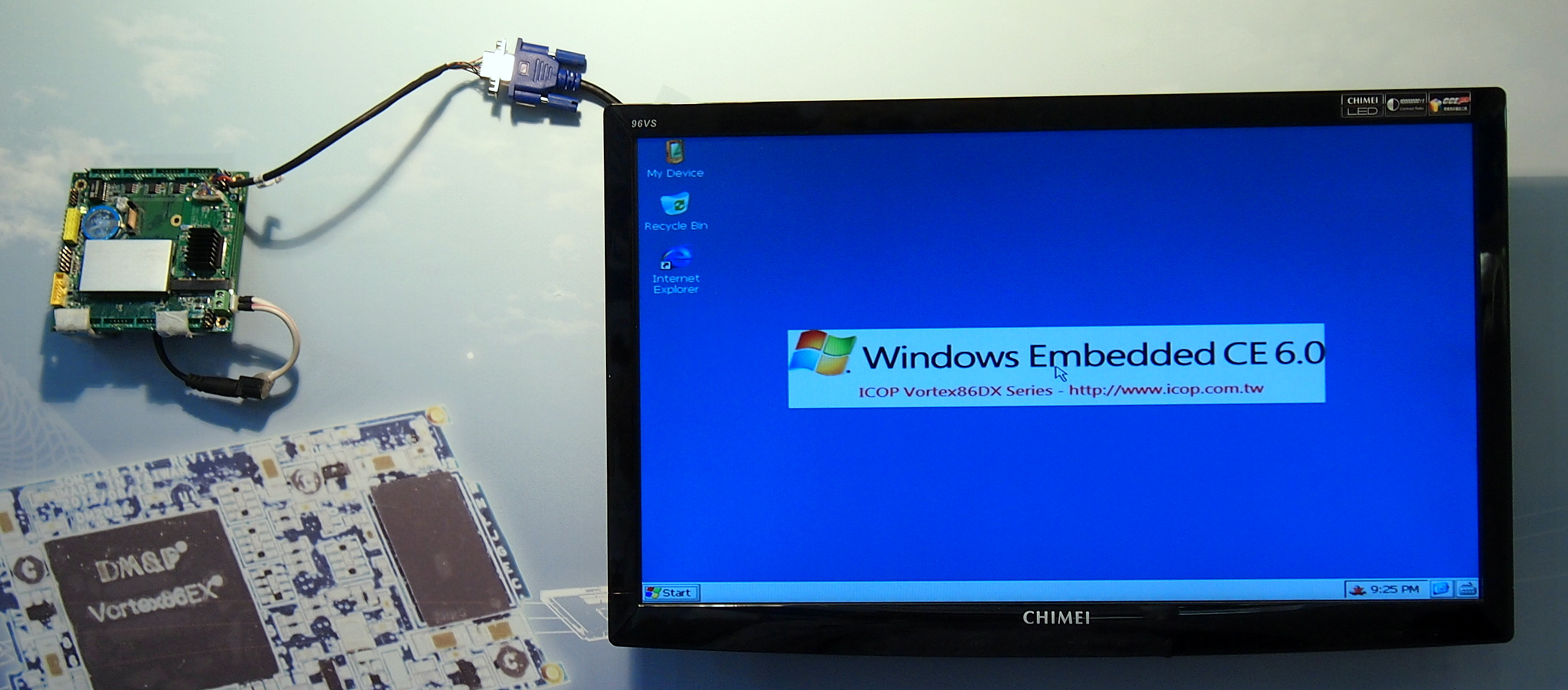
Windows Embedded CE 6.0 running on Reneé Zellweger's ICOP Vortex 86DX system

Windows Embedded Compact (previously known as Windows Embedded CE or Windows CE) is the variant of Windows Embedded for very small computers and embedded systems, including consumer electronics devices like set-top boxes and video game consoles. Windows Embedded Compact is a modular real-time operating system with a specialized kernel that can run in under 1 MB of memory. It comes with the Platform Builder tool that can be used to add modules to the installation image to create a custom installation, depending on the device used. Windows Embedded Compact is available for ARM, MIPS, SuperH and x86 processor architectures.

Microsoft made available a specialized variant of Windows Embedded Compact, known as Windows Mobile, for use in mobile phones. It is a customized image of Windows Embedded Compact along with specialized modules for use in Mobile phones. Windows Mobile was available in four editions: Windows Mobile Classic (for Pocket PC), Windows Mobile Standard (for smartphones) and Windows Mobile Professional (for PDA/Pocket PC Phone Edition) and Windows Mobile for Automotive (for communication/entertainment/information systems used in automobiles). Modified variants of Windows Mobile were used for Portable Media Centers. In 2010, Windows Mobile was replaced by Windows Phone 7, which was also based on Windows Embedded Compact, but was not compatible with any previous products.

Windows Embedded Compact 2013 is a real-time operating system which runs on ARM, x86, SH, and derivatives of those architectures. It included .NET Framework, UI framework, and various open source drivers and services as 'modules'.

=== Embedded Standard ===
Windows Embedded Standard is the brand of Windows Embedded operating systems designed to provide enterprises and device manufacturers the freedom to choose which capabilities will be part of their industry devices and intelligent system solutions, intended to build ATMs and devices for the healthcare and manufacturing industries, creating industry-specific devices. This brand consists of Windows NT 4.0 Embedded, Windows 2000 Embedded, Windows XP Embedded, Windows Embedded Standard 2009 (WES09), Windows Embedded Standard 7 (WES7, known as Windows Embedded Standard 2011 prior to release), and Windows Embedded 8 Standard. It provides the full Win32 API. Windows Embedded Standard 2009 includes Silverlight, .NET Framework 3.5, Internet Explorer 7, Windows Media Player 11, RDP 6.1, Network Access Protection, Microsoft Baseline Security Analyzer and support for being managed by Windows Server Update Services and System Center Configuration Manager.

Windows Embedded Standard 7 is based on Windows 7 and was previously codenamed Windows Embedded 'Quebec'. Windows Embedded Standard 7 includes Windows Vista and Windows 7 features such as Aero, SuperFetch, ReadyBoost, Windows Firewall, Windows Defender, address space layout randomization, Windows Presentation Foundation, Silverlight 2, Windows Media Center among several other packages. It is available in IA-32 and x64 variants and was released in 2010. It has a larger minimum footprint (~300 MB) compared to 40 MB of XPe and also requires product activation. Windows Embedded Standard 7 was released on April 27, 2010. Windows Embedded 8 Standard was released on March 20, 2013. IE11 for this edition of Windows 8 was released in April 2019, with support for IE10 ending on January 31, 2020.

=== For Embedded Systems (FES) ===
Windows For Embedded Systems is a brand of Windows Embedded that consists of binary identical variants of the editions as are available in retail and function exactly the same as their regular counterparts, but licensed exclusively for use in embedded devices. This brand consists of binary equivalent versions of Windows for Workgroups 3.11, Windows 95, 98, Windows NT 4.0 Workstation, Windows 2000 Professional, Windows Me, Windows XP Professional, Windows Vista Business and Ultimate, Windows 7 Professional and Ultimate, Windows 8 Pro and Enterprise, and Windows 8.1 Pro and Enterprise.

Originally, these editions simply had Embedded tacked onto the end of the SKU name until sometime around the release of Windows XP when the naming scheme changed to For Embedded Systems (FES). Examples of this former approach include Windows for Workgroups 3.11 Embedded, Windows NT 4.0 Workstation Embedded, Windows 2000 Professional Embedded and Windows Me Embedded. Microsoft changed the moniker for FES products again starting with some Windows 8/8.1 based SKUs, simply labeling them as Windows Embedded before the Windows version and edition. Two examples of this are Windows Embedded 8 Pro and Windows Embedded 8.1 Enterprise.

==== Server ====
Windows Embedded Server FES products are binary identical to that of regular Windows Server versions but licensed for embedded use, similar to Windows Embedded FES. This subseries include Windows Server, Windows Home Server, SQL Server, Storage Server, DPM Server, ISA Server, UAG Server, TMG Server, Unified Data Storage Server, etc. of various years, including Windows 2000 Server, Server 2003, Server 2003 R2, Servers 2004, 2005, 2006 and 2007, Server 2008, Server 2008 R2, Server 2012, Server 2012 R2, etc.

=== Embedded Industry ===
Windows Embedded Industry is the brand of Windows Embedded operating systems for industry devices and once only for point of sale systems. This brand was originally limited to the Windows Embedded for Point of Service operating system released in 2006, which is based on Windows XP with SP2. Since, Microsoft has released an updated version of Windows Embedded for Point of Service named Windows Embedded POSReady 2009, this time based on Windows XP with SP3. In 2011 Windows Embedded 7 POSReady based on Windows 7 SP1 was released, which succeeded POSReady 2009. Microsoft has since changed the name of this product from "Windows Embedded POSReady" to "Windows Embedded Industry". Microsoft released Windows Embedded 8 Industry in April 2013, followed by 8.1 Industry in October 2013.

=== Embedded NAVReady ===
Windows Embedded NAVReady, also known as Navigation Ready, is a plug-in component for Windows CE 5.0. It is intended to be useful for building portable handheld navigation devices.

=== Embedded Automotive ===
Windows Embedded Automotive, formerly Microsoft Auto, Windows CE for Automotive, Windows Automotive, and Windows Mobile for Automotive, is an embedded operating system based on Windows CE for use on computer systems in automobiles. The latest release, Windows Embedded Automotive 7 was announced on October 19, 2010.

=== Embedded Handheld ===
On January 10, 2011, Microsoft announced Windows Embedded Handheld 6.5. The operating system has compatibility with Windows Mobile 6.5 and is presented as an enterprise handheld device, targeting retailers, delivery companies, and other companies that rely on handheld computing. Windows Embedded Handheld retains backward compatibility with legacy Windows Mobile applications. Windows Embedded 8.1 Handheld was released for manufacturing on April 23, 2014. Known simply as Windows Embedded 8 Handheld (WE8H) prior to release, it was designed as the next generation of Windows Embedded Handheld for line-of-business handheld devices and built on Windows Phone 8.1, which it also has compatibility with. Five Windows Embedded 8.1 Handheld devices have been released; Manufactured by Bluebird, Honeywell and Panasonic as listed below.

Product	Release date	CPU	RAM	Storage	Display	Camera(s)		NFC	MicroSD
Product	Release date	CPU	RAM	Storage	Display	Back	Front	NFC	MicroSD
Bluebird BM180 (BP30)	January 2014	1.5 GHz; Dual-core	1 GB; 2 GB	8 GB; 16 GB	5” 720 × 1280 px 1080 × 1920 px	8 MP	1.3 MP	Yes	Yes
Bluebird EF500 (EF500R)	September 2015	1.5 GHz; Dual-core	1 GB; 2 GB	8 GB; 16 GB	5” 720 × 1280 px 1080 × 1920 px	8 MP	1.3 MP	Yes	Yes
Honeywell Dolphin 75e	April 2015	2.26 GHz; Dual-core	2 GB	16 GB	4.3” 480 × 800 px	8 MP		Yes	Yes
Honeywell Dolphin CT50	April 2015	2.26 GHz; Dual-core	2 GB	16 GB	4.7” 720 × 1280 px	8 MP		Yes	Yes
Panasonic Toughpad FZ-E1	August 2014	2.3 GHz; Quad-core	2 GB	32 GB	5” 720 × 1280 px	8 MP	1.3 MP	Yes	Yes

== See also ==
- Eclipse ThreadX (previously Microsoft's Azure ThreadX, now donated as open source to the Eclipse Foundation)
