= SuperH =

Instruction set architecture by Hitachi

SuperH (SH)
- Designer: Hitachi
- Bits: 32-bit (32 → 64)
- Introduced: 1992
- Design: RISC
- Encoding: SH-2: 16-bit instructions SH-2A and newer: mixed 16- and 32-bit instructions
- Endianness: Bi
- Open: Yes, and royalty-free (reverse-engineered after patents expired)

SuperH (or SH) is a 32-bit reduced instruction set computing (RISC) instruction set architecture (ISA) developed by Hitachi and currently produced by Renesas. It is implemented by microcontrollers and microprocessors for embedded systems.

At the time of introduction, SuperH was notable for having fixed-length 16-bit instructions in spite of its 32-bit architecture. Using smaller instructions had consequences: the register file was smaller and instructions were generally two-operand format. However, for the market the SuperH was aimed at, this was a small price to pay for the improved memory and processor cache efficiency.

Later versions of the design, starting with SH-5, included both 16- and 32-bit instructions, with the 16-bit versions mapping onto the 32-bit version inside the CPU. This allowed the machine code to continue using the shorter instructions to save memory, while not demanding the amount of instruction decoding logic needed if they were completely separate instructions. This concept is now known as a compressed instruction set and is also used by other companies, the most notable examples being ARM for its Thumb instruction set, along with RISC-V for its compressed extensions.

In 2015, many of the original patents for the SuperH architecture expired and the SH-2 CPU was reimplemented as open source hardware under the name J2.

== History ==
=== SH-1 and SH-2 ===
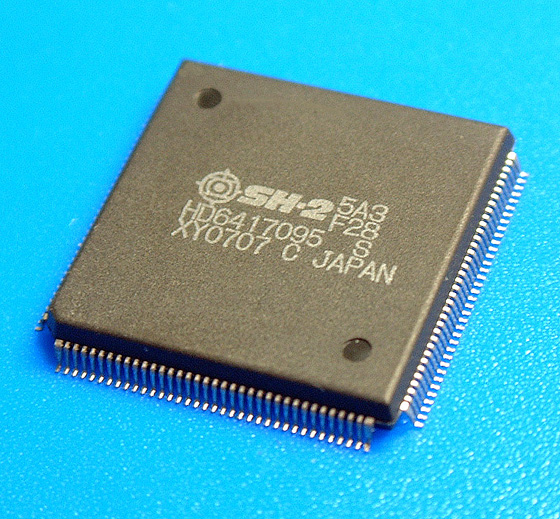
SH-2 on Sega 32X and Sega Saturn

The SuperH processor core family was first developed by Hitachi in the early 1990s. The design concept was for a single instruction set (ISA) that would be upward compatible across a series of CPU cores.

In the past, this sort of design problem would have been solved using microcode, with the low-end models in the series performing non-implemented instructions as a series of more basic instructions. For instance, a "long multiply" (multiplying two 32-bit registers to produce a 64-bit product) might be implemented in hardware on high-end models but instead be performed as a series of additions on low-end models.

One of the key realizations during the development of the RISC concept was that the microcode had a finite decoding time, and as processors became faster, this represented an unacceptable performance overhead. To address this, Hitachi instead developed a single ISA for the entire line, with unsupported instructions causing traps on those implementations that didn't include hardware support. For instance, the initial models in the line, the SH-1 and SH-2, differed only in their support for 64-bit multiplication; the SH-2 supported MUL, DMULS and DMULU, whereas the SH-1 would cause a trap if these were encountered.

The SH-1 was the basic model, supporting a total of 56 instructions. The SH-2 added 64-bit multiplication and a few additional commands for branching and other duties, bringing the total to 62 supported instructions. The SH-1 and the SH-2 were used in the Sega Saturn, Sega 32X and Capcom CPS-3.

The ISA uses 16-bit instructions for better code density than 32-bit instructions, which was important at the time due to the high cost of main memory and the implementation cost of cache. As of 2023, code density is still important for small embedded systems and massively multicore processors. The downsides to this approach were that there were fewer bits available to encode a register number or a constant value. In the original SuperH ISA, there were only 16 general registers, requiring four bits for the source and another four for the destination; however some instructions have an implied R0, R15, or a system register as an extra operand. The instruction opcode is four, eight, twelve, or sixteen bits long, and the remaining four-bit fields are used for register or immediate operands in various ways: there are twelve classes of instructions, for a total of 142 instructions in SH-2.

Delayed branches are introduced for both SH-1 and SH-2. Unconditional branch instructions have one delay slot.

=== SH-3 ===
A few years later, the SH-3 core was added to the family; new features included another interrupt concept, a memory management unit (MMU), and a modified cache concept. These features required an extended instruction set, adding six new instructions for a total of 68. The SH-3 was bi-endian, running in either big-endian or little-endian byte ordering.

The SH-3 core also added a DSP extension, then called SH-3-DSP. With extended data paths for efficient DSP processing, special accumulators and a dedicated MAC-type DSP engine, this core unified the DSP and the RISC processor world. A derivative of the DSP was also used with the original SH-2 core. It was used in Microsoft's Pocket PC cellphone line.

Between 1994 and 1996, 35.1 million SuperH devices were shipped worldwide.

=== SH-4 ===
In 1997, Hitachi and STMicroelectronics (STM) started collaborating on the design of the SH-4 for the Dreamcast. SH-4 featured superscalar (2-way) instruction execution and a vector floating-point unit (particularly suited to 3D graphics). Standard chips based on the SH-4 were introduced around 1998.

=== Licensing ===
In early 2001, Hitachi and STM formed the IP company SuperH, Inc., which was going to license the SH-4 core to other companies and was developing the SH-5 architecture, the first move of SuperH into the 64-bit area. The earlier SH-1 through 3 remained the property of Hitachi.

In 2003, Hitachi and Mitsubishi Electric formed a joint-venture called Renesas Technology, with Hitachi controlling 55% of it. In 2004, Renesas Technology bought STMicroelectronics's share of ownership in the SuperH Inc. and with it the licence to the SH cores. Renesas Technology later became Renesas Electronics, following their merger with NEC Electronics.

The SH-5 design supported two modes of operation: SHcompact mode, which is equivalent to the user-mode instructions of the SH-4 instruction set; and SHmedia mode, which is very different in that it uses 32-bit instructions with sixty-four 64-bit integer registers and SIMD instructions. In SHmedia mode the destination of a branch (jump) is loaded into a branch register separately from the actual branch instruction. This allows the processor to prefetch instructions for a branch without having to snoop the instruction stream. The combination of a compact 16-bit instruction encoding with a more powerful 32-bit instruction encoding is not unique to SH-5; ARM processors have a 16-bit Thumb mode (ARM licensed several patents from SuperH for Thumb) and MIPS processors have a MIPS-16 mode. However, SH-5 differs because its backward compatibility mode is the 16-bit encoding rather than the 32-bit encoding.

The last evolutionary step happened around 2003 where the cores from SH-2 up to SH-4 were getting unified into a superscalar SH-X core which formed a kind of instruction set superset of the previous architectures, and added support for symmetric multiprocessing.

=== Continued availability ===
Since 2010, the SuperH CPU cores, architecture, and product designs are owned by Renesas Electronics, with the architecture consolidated around the SH-2, SH-2A, SH-3, SH-4 and SH-4A platforms.

Renesas's system-on-chip products originally based on SH-3, SH-4, and SH-4A microprocessors were subsequently replaced by newer generations based on licensed CPU cores from Arm Ltd., though many of the existing models continued to be marketed and sold until March 2025 through the Renesas Product Longevity Program.

As of 2021, the SH72xx microcontrollers based on the SH-2A continue to be marketed by Renesas with guaranteed availability until February 2029, along with newer products based on several other architectures including Arm, RX, and RH850.

=== J Core ===
The last of the SH-2 patents expired in 2014. At LinuxCon Japan 2015, j-core developers presented a cleanroom reimplemention of the SH-2 ISA with extensions (known as the "J2 core" due to the unexpired trademarks). A design walkthrough was presented at ELC 2016.

The open source BSD-licensed VHDL code for the J2 core has been proven on Xilinx FPGAs and on ASICs manufactured on TSMC's 180 nm process, and is capable of booting μClinux. J2 is backwards ISA compatible with SH-2, implemented as a 5-stage pipeline with separate Instruction and Data memory interfaces, and a machine-generated Instruction Decoder supporting the densely packed and complex (relative to other RISC machines) ISA. Additional instructions are easy to add. J2 implements instructions for dynamic shift (using the SH-3 and later instruction patterns), extended atomic operations (used for threading primitives) and locking/interfaces for symmetric multiprocessor support.

As of July 2026, the last news item on the j-core.org website is from 31 August 2016, and the "downloads" link on the front page displays a 403 forbidden error.

Several features of SuperH have been cited as motivations for designing new cores based on this architecture:

- High code density compared to other 32-bit RISC ISAs such as ARM or MIPS important for cache and memory bandwidth performance
- Existing compiler and operating system support (Linux, Windows Embedded, QNX.)
- Patent- and royalty-free (BSD-licensed) implementation.
- Availability of low cost hardware development platform for free FPGA tools.
- Open source design, generation, simulation and verification environment.

== Models ==
Generation comparison
	Clock [MHz]	Computer performance			Image
	Clock [MHz]	MIPS	MOPS	GFLOPS	Image
SH-1	20	20			SH-1-Prozessor
SH-2	28,7	78	120		SH-2-Prozessor
SH-3	200	260	400		SH-3-Prozessor
SH-4	200	480		1,9	SH-4-Prozessor
SH-5	400	700	9600	2,8	
SH-6		>2000	>24000	>7,0	

The family of SuperH CPU cores includes:

- SH-1 – used in microcontrollers for deeply embedded applications (CD-ROM drives, major appliances, etc.)
- SH-2 – used in microcontrollers with higher performance requirements, networking applications, and also in video game consoles, like the Sega Saturn and Sega 32X add-on. The SH-2 has also found home in many automotive engine control unit applications, including Subaru, Mitsubishi, and Mazda.
- SH-2A – The SH-2A core is an extension of the SH-2 core including a few extra instructions but most importantly moving to a superscalar architecture (it is capable of executing more than one instruction in a single cycle) and two five-stage pipelines. It also incorporates 15 register banks to facilitate an interrupt latency of 6 clock cycles. It is also strong in motor control application but also in multimedia, car audio, powertrain, automotive body control and office + building automation
- SH-DSP – initially developed for the mobile phone market, used later in many consumer applications requiring DSP performance for JPEG compression etc.
- SH-3 – used for mobile and handheld applications such as the Jornada, strong in Windows CE applications and market for many years in the car navigation market. The Cave CV1000, similar to the Sega NAOMI hardware's CPU, also made use of this CPU. The Korg Electribe EMX and ESX music production units also use the SH-3 as did Casio graphics calculators until 2013.
- SH-3-DSP – used mainly in multimedia terminals and networking applications, also in printers and fax machines
- SH-4 – used whenever high performance is required such as car multimedia terminals, video game consoles, most notably the Dreamcast, or set-top boxes. Later used extensively in SH-4A form by Casio graphics calculators from 2011 to date.
- SH-5 – intended for high-end 64-bit multimedia applications
- SH-X – mainstream core used in various flavours (with/without DSP or FPU unit) in engine control unit, car multimedia equipment, set-top boxes or mobile phones
- SH-Mobile – SuperH Mobile Application Processor; designed to offload application processing from the baseband LSI

=== SH-2 ===
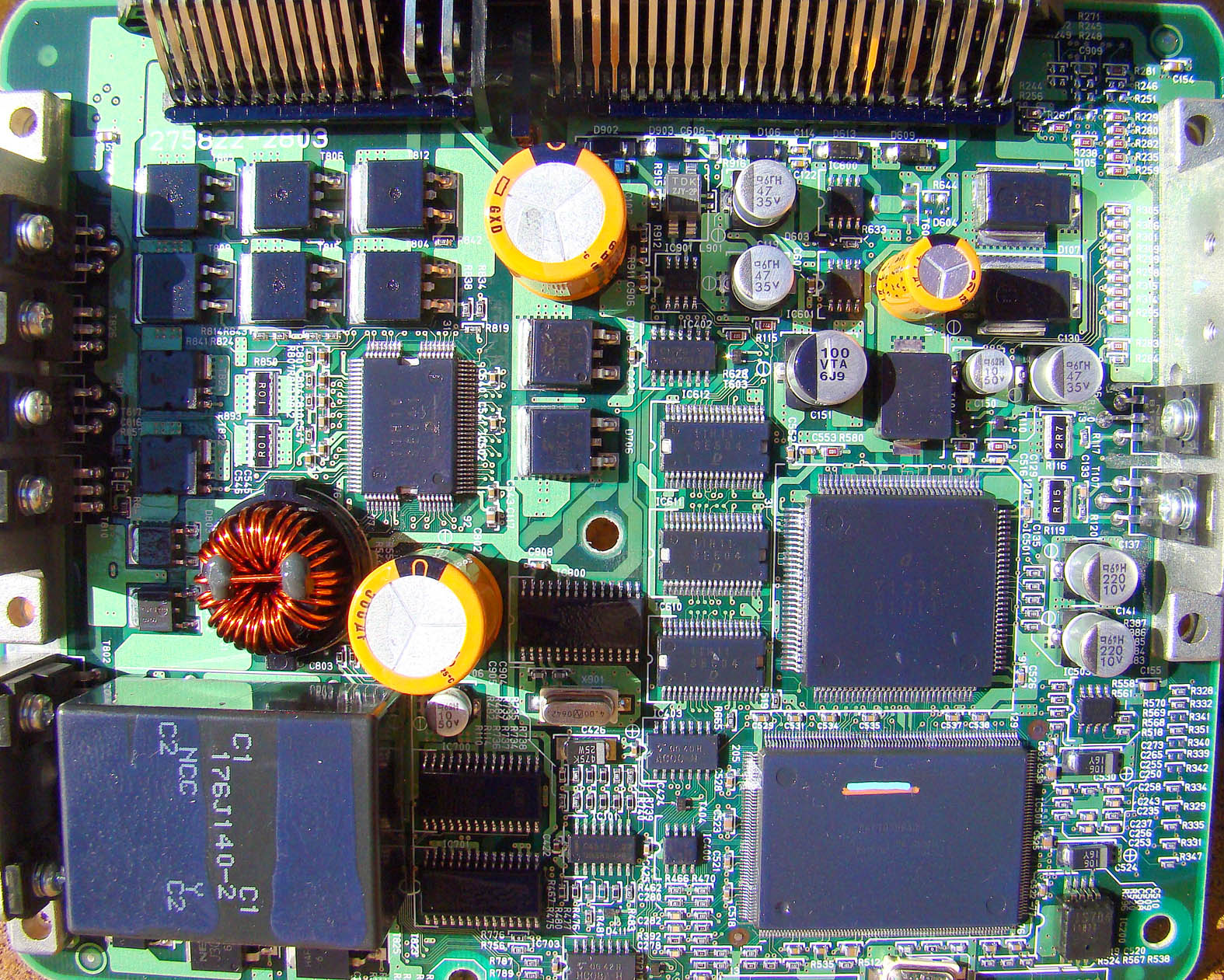
Hitachi SH-2 CPU (bottom-right, with colored stripes on it)

The SH-2 is a 32-bit RISC architecture with a 16-bit fixed instruction length for high code density and features a hardware multiply–accumulate (MAC) block for DSP algorithms and has a five-stage pipeline.

The SH-2 has a cache on all ROM-less devices.

It provides 16 general-purpose registers, a vector-base register, global-base register, and a procedure register.

Today the SH-2 family stretches from 32 KB of on-board flash up to ROM-less devices. It is used in a variety of different devices with differing peripherals such as CAN, Ethernet, motor-control timer unit, fast ADC and others.

=== SH-2A ===
The SH-2A is an upgrade to the SH-2 core that added some 32-bit instructions. It was announced in early 2006.

New features on the SH-2A core include:

- Superscalar architecture: execution of 2 instructions simultaneously
- Harvard architecture
- Two 5-stage pipelines
- Mixed 16-bit and 32-bit instructions
- 15 register banks for interrupt response in 6 cycles.
- Optional FPU

The SH-2A family today spans a wide memory field from 16 KB up to and includes many ROM-less variations. The devices feature standard peripherals such as CAN, Ethernet, USB and more as well as more application-specific peripherals such as motor control timers, TFT controllers and peripherals dedicated to automotive powertrain applications.

=== SH-3 ===
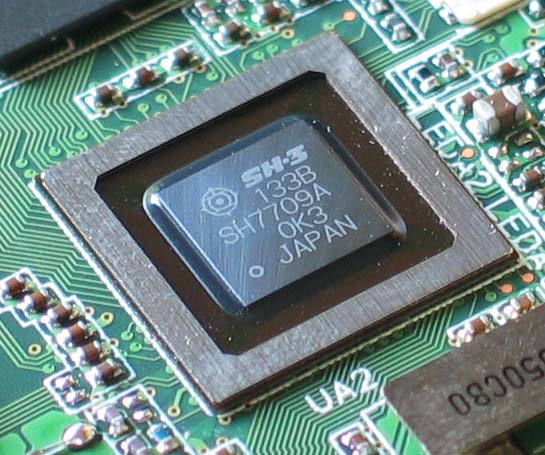
Hitachi SH-3 CPU (BGA version)

Implemented by Casio as a chip on board under the model codes SH7291 (Classpad range, 2003 to 2013) and SH7355 (mid to high-end graphics calculators, 2005 to 2011).

=== SH-4 ===
The SH-4 is a RISC CPU and was developed for primary use in multimedia applications, such as Sega's Dreamcast and NAOMI game systems. It includes a much more powerful floating-point unit and additional built-in functions, along with the standard 32-bit integer processing and 16-bit instruction size.

SH-4 features include:

- FPU with four floating-point multipliers, supporting 32-bit single-precision and 64-bit double-precision floats
- 4D floating-point dot-product operation and matrix–vector multiplication
- 128-bit floating-point bus allowing 3.2 GB/sec transfer rate from the data cache
- 64-bit external data bus with 32-bit memory addressing, allowing a maximum of 4 GB addressable memory (see Byte addressing) with a transfer rate of 800 MB/sec
- Built-in interrupt, DMA, and power management controllers

=== SH-4A ===
Variant of the SH-4 without floating-point unit but including the DSP instruction set extension instead. Implemented by Casio as a chip on board under the model code SH7305 and used in their graphics calculators since 2011, the latest being the fx-CG100 launched in 2025.

=== SH-5 ===
The SH-5 is a 64-bit RISC CPU.

Almost no non-simulated SH-5 hardware was ever released, and, unlike the still-live SH-4, support for SH-5 was dropped from GCC and Linux.

=== SH-6 ===
SH-6 was an announced-but-never-implemented further development. It was supposed to achieve over 2 GIPS, over 7 GFLOPS and over 24 GOPS.
