= Tony Fadell =

American engineer and designer (born 1969)

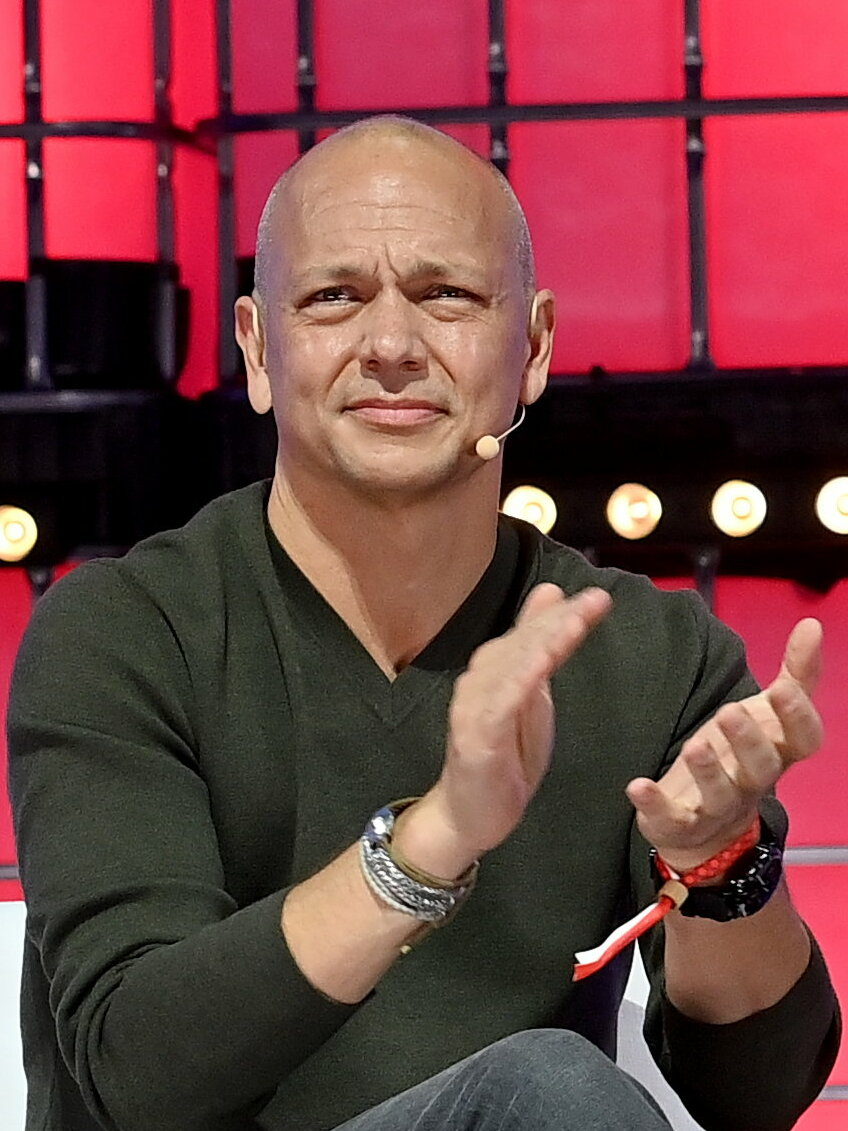
- Fadell in 2022
- Born: Anthony Michael Fadell; March 22, 1969 (age 57); Michigan, US
- Education: University of Michigan (BS)
- Occupations: Engineer; designer; entrepreneur; investor
- Employer(s): General Magic; Apple Inc; Nest Labs
- Known for: iPod iPhone; Nest Thermostat

Anthony Michael Fadell (born March 22, 1969) is an American engineer, designer, entrepreneur, and investor. He was senior vice president of the iPod division at Apple Inc. and founder and former CEO of Nest Labs.

Fadell joined Apple Inc. in 2001 and oversaw all iPod hardware, software, and accessories development. He is known as the "father of the iPod". As the co-creator of the iPhone, he also worked on the first three generations of the iPhone and oversaw all iPhone hardware, firmware, and accessories development from March 2006 to November 2008.

In May 2010, he co-founded Nest Labs, which announced its first product, the Nest Learning Thermostat, in October 2011. Nest was acquired by Google in January 2014 for $3.2B.

Fadell has authored more than 300 patents and was named one of Time's "100 Most Influential People in the World" in 2014. In 2016 Time named the Nest Learning Thermostat, the iPod and the iPhone as three of the “50 Most Influential Gadgets of All Time".

== Early life and education ==
Fadell was born on March 22, 1969, in Michigan, to a Lebanese father and Polish mother. Fadell is an alumnus of Grosse Pointe South High School in Grosse Pointe Farms, Michigan. He graduated from the University of Michigan with a Bachelor of Science (BS) degree in computer engineering in 1991.

== Career ==
=== General Magic ===
After college, Fadell worked for Apple spinoff General Magic for three years, working with Sony, Philips, Matsushita, Toshiba and other consumer electronics firms in the "General Magic Alliance" to develop a line of personal handheld communicators. He started in 1992 as a diagnostics engineer and progressed to a systems architect.

=== Philips Electronics ===
In 1995, he was hired by Philips where he co-founded their Mobile Computing Group and was the chief technology officer, and director of engineering. He developed a number of Windows CE-based hand-held devices, notably the Philips Velo and Nino PDA. Fadell went on to become a vice president of Philips Strategy and Ventures where he was in charge of developing Philips's digital audio strategy consisting of technology direction for silicon and software, as well as its investment portfolio and potential business models.

=== Fuse ===
After Philips Fadell worked at RealNetworks for six weeks.

In July 1999, Fadell started his own company called Fuse to develop the "Dell of the Consumer Electronics". One of the devices he had in mind was a small hard disk-based music player and an online-store-for-music. Fuse failed, however, to find a second round of funding, and Fadell started exploring developing the product at other companies.

=== Apple Inc. ===
Fadell is known as the "father of the iPod". Fadell found support for his business idea of an MP3 player complemented by an online music store in Apple. In 2001 Fadell was hired by Apple as a contractor designing the iPod and planning Apple's audio product strategy. His idea for a small hard disk-based music player and an online-store-for-music had caught Steve Jobs's attention. During that time, he created the concept and initial design of the iPod. He was then hired by Apple to assemble and run its iPod & Special Projects group in April 2001. He was tasked with overseeing the design and production of the iPod and iSight devices.

Due to the engineers and resources at Apple being constrained with the Mac line, Fadell hired engineers from his startup company, Fuse, and veteran engineers from General Magic and Philips to build the core iPod development team. He also hired an outside company to develop the software for the player.

He was promoted to vice president of iPod engineering in 2004 and on October 14, 2005, Apple announced that Fadell would replace the retiring Jon Rubinstein as Senior Vice President of the iPod Division on March 31, 2006.

On November 3, 2008, The Wall Street Journal broke the story of Fadell's departure from Apple.

=== Nest Labs, Inc. ===
Fadell developed the business plan for Nest while living in Paris in 2009.

Together with Matt Rogers, a former Apple colleague, he set out to redesign the traditional thermostat. In May 2010 Fadell and Rogers co-founded Nest Labs in Palo Alto, CA. Nest announced its first product, the Nest Learning Thermostat, in October 2011. Nest was acquired by Google in January 2014 for $3.2B. Fadell announced his resignation as CEO of Nest on June 3, 2016.

=== Build Collective ===
As of 2017, Fadell has been running a venture fund originally called Future Shape, now called Build Collective.

=== Author ===
His book Build: An Unorthodox Guide to Making Things Worth Making was released May 3, 2022. Build has been named a New York Times, Wall Street Journal, and USA Today best seller.

=== Awards and honors ===
In 2012, he was the recipient of the Alva Award, honoring him as "the next great serial inventor". Vanity Fair also recognized him as a trailblazer on their 2012 Next Establishment list. In 2013, Fadell was acknowledged as one of Business Insider's Top 75 Designers in Technology, Fast Company's 100 Most Creative People, and CNBC's Top 50 Disruptors.

Overview of awards and recognitions:

- (2012) Alva Award, "The Next Great Serial Inventor"
- (2012) (2013) (2014) Vanity Fair, Next Establishment list
- (2013) Business Insider, Top 75 Designers in Technology
- (2013) Fast Company, 100 Most Creative People
- (2013) CNBC, Top 50 Disruptors
- (2013) Fortune, Trailblazers: 11 people changing business
- (2014) Fortune, The World's Top 25 Eco-Innovators
- (2014) Time, 100 Most Influential People in the World
- (2014) CNN, CNN 10: Thinkers
- (2014) Golden Plate Award, American Academy of Achievement, presented by Awards Council member George Lucas
- (2016) Time, named the Nest Learning Thermostat, the iPod and the iPhone as three of the "50 Most Influential Gadgets of All Time"
- (2017) Global High-Tech Award, State Award of Armenia for Global Contribution to Humanity through High-Tech
