= IPod =

Line of portable media players by Apple (2001–2022)

iPod

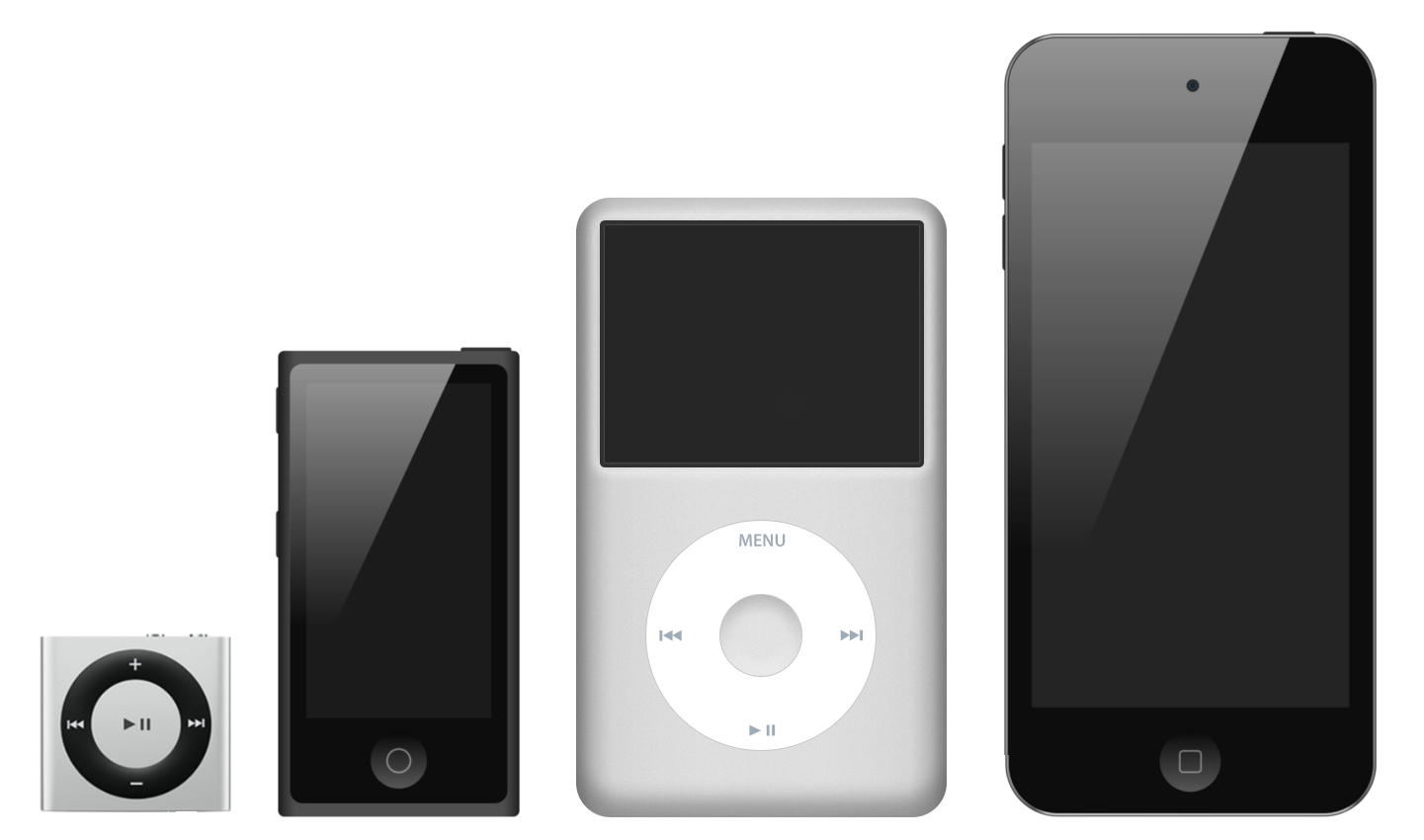
- The final iteration of each iPod product. From left to right: iPod Shuffle, iPod Nano, iPod Classic and iPod Touch.
- Developer: Apple
- Type: Portable media player
- Released: November 10, 2001
- Discontinued: May 10, 2022
- Units sold: 450 million (as of May 2022)
- Storage: 512 MB–256 GB
- Related: iPad; iPhone; (comparison)
- Website: apple.com/ipod redirects to support.apple.com/ipod-touch

The iPod is a discontinued series of portable media players and multi-purpose mobile devices that was designed and marketed by Apple from 2001 to 2022. The first version was released on November 10, 2001, 10 months after the Macintosh version of iTunes was released. Apple has sold an estimated 450 million iPods. Apple officially discontinued the iPod product line on May 10, 2022. The iPod is the longest-running product discontinued by Apple, with a total lifespan of over 20 years.

Some versions of the iPod can serve as external data storage devices, like other digital music players. Prior to macOS 10.15, Apple's iTunes software (and other alternative software) could be used to transfer music, photos, videos, games, contact information, e-mail settings, Web bookmarks, and calendars to the devices supporting these features from computers using certain versions of Apple macOS and Microsoft Windows operating systems.

Before the release of iOS 5, the iPod branding was used for the media player included with the iPhone and iPad, which was separated into apps named "Music" and "Videos" on the iPod Touch. As of iOS 10.2, the Videos app was incorporated into the modern Apple TV app. While the iPhone and iPad have essentially the same media player capabilities as the iPod line, they are generally treated as separate products. During the middle of 2010, iPhone sales overtook those of the iPod.

== History ==
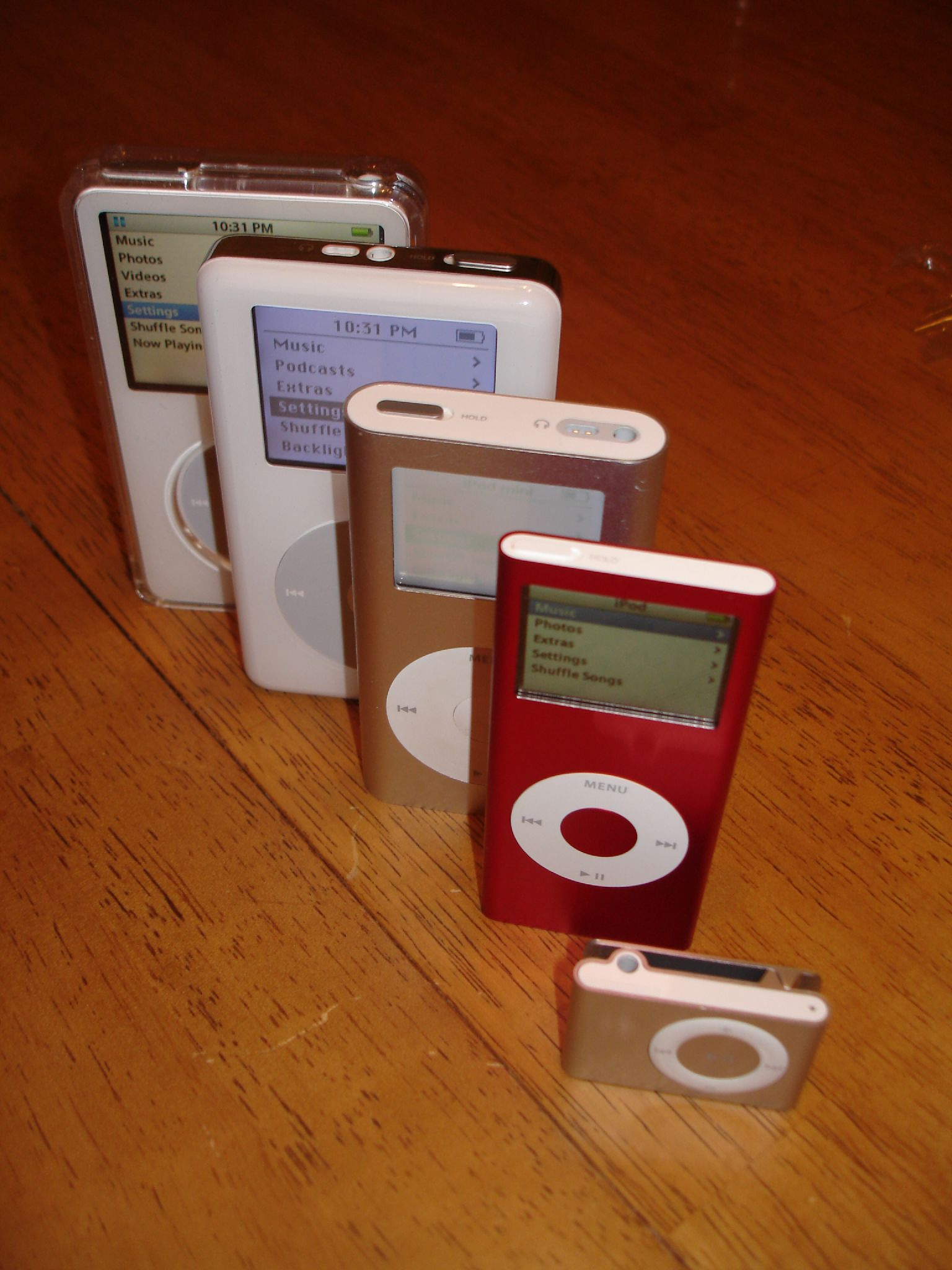
Various iPod models. From left to right: iPod 5th generation in a case, iPod 4th generation, iPod Mini, iPod Nano, iPod Shuffle

Portable MP3 players had existed since 1997; however, Apple found that existing digital music players were either "big and clunky" or "small and useless" with user interfaces that were "unbelievably awful". They also identified weaknesses in existing models' attempt to negotiate the trade-off between capacity and portability: flash memory-based players held too few songs, while the hard drive based models were too big and heavy. To address these deficits, the company decided to develop its own MP3 player.

At Apple CEO Steve Jobs' direction, hardware engineering chief Jon Rubinstein recruited Tony Fadell, a former employee of General Magic and Philips, who had a business idea to invent a better MP3 player and build a complementary music sales store. Fadell had previously developed the Philips Velo and Nino PDA before starting a company called Fuse Systems to build the new MP3 player, but RealNetworks, Sony and Philips had already passed on the project. Rubinstein had already discovered the Toshiba hard disk drive while meeting with an Apple supplier in Japan, ultimately purchasing the rights to it for Apple. Rubinstein had also already made substantial progress on development of other key hardware elements, including the device's screen and battery.

Fadell found support for his project with Apple Computer and was hired by Apple in 2001 as an independent contractor to work on the iPod project, then code-named project P-68. Because most of Apple's engineering manpower and resources were already dedicated to the iMac line, Fadell hired engineers from his startup company, Fuse, and veteran engineers from General Magic and Philips to build the core iPod development team.

Time constraints forced Fadell to develop various components of the iPod outside Apple. Fadell partnered with a company called PortalPlayer to design software for the device; this work eventually took shape as the iPod OS. Within eight months, Tony Fadell's team and PortalPlayer had completed a prototype. The power supply was then designed by Michael Dhuey. The original iPod's physical appearance was inspired by the 1958 Braun T3 transistor radio designed by Dieter Rams, while the wheel-based user interface drew on Bang & Olufsen's BeoCom 6000 telephone. Apple CEO Steve Jobs set an exacting standard for the device's physical design.

Apple contracted another company, named Pixo, to help design and implement the user interface (as well as Unicode, memory management, and event processing) and the firmware under Jobs' direct supervision.

The name iPod was proposed by Vinnie Chieco, a freelance copywriter, who (with others) was contracted by Apple to determine how to introduce the new player to the public. After Chieco saw a prototype, he was reminded of the phrase "Open the pod bay doors, Hal" from the classic sci-fi film 2001: A Space Odyssey, referring to the white EVA Pods of the Discovery One spaceship. Chieco's proposal drew an analogy between the relationship of the spaceship to the smaller independent pods and that of a personal computer to its companion music player.

The product (which Fortune called "Apple's 21st-Century Walkman") was developed in less than one year and unveiled on October 23, 2001. Jobs announced it as a Mac-compatible product with a 5 GB hard drive that put "1,000 songs in your pocket".

Apple researched the trademark and found that it was already in use. Joseph N. Grasso of New Jersey had originally listed an "iPod" trademark with the U.S. Patent and Trademark Office (USPTO) in July 2000 for Internet kiosks. First demonstrated in New Jersey in March 1998, iPod kiosks saw commercial use from January 2000 until the venture was discontinued by 2001. The trademark was registered by the USPTO (or TSPMO) in November 2003, and Grasso assigned it to Apple Computer, Inc. in 2005. Separately, the earliest recorded use in commerce of an "iPod" trademark was in 1991 by Chrysalis Corp. of Sturgis, Michigan, styled "iPOD", for office furniture.

As development of the iPod progressed, Apple continued to refine the software's look and feel, rewriting much of the code. Starting with the iPod Mini, the Chicago font was replaced with Espy Sans. Later iPods switched fonts again to Podium Sans—a font similar to Apple's corporate font, Myriad. Color display iPods then adopted some Mac OS X themes like Aqua progress bars, and a brushed metal appearance in the screen lock interface.

On January 8, 2004, Hewlett-Packard (HP) announced that they would sell HP-branded iPods under a license agreement from Apple. Several new retail channels were used—including Walmart—and these iPods eventually made up 5% of all iPod sales. In July 2005, HP stopped selling iPods due to unfavorable terms and conditions imposed by Apple.

In 2006, Apple partnered with Irish rock band U2 to present a special edition of the 5th-generation iPod. Like its predecessor, this iPod has the signatures of the four members of the band engraved on its back, but this one was the first time the company changed the color of the stainless steel back from a silver chrome to black. This iPod was only available with 30 GB of storage capacity. The special edition entitled purchasers to an exclusive video with 33 minutes of interviews and performance by U2, downloadable from the iTunes Store.

In 2007, Apple modified the iPod interface again with the introduction of the sixth-generation iPod Classic and third-generation iPod Nano by changing the font to Helvetica and, in most cases, splitting the screen in half, displaying the menus on the left and submenu content (album artwork, photos, videos, etc.) on the right.

In mid-2015, several new color schemes for all of the current iPod models were spotted in the iTunes 12.2 update. Belgian website Belgium iPhone originally found the images after plugging in an iPod for the first time, and subsequent photos were discovered by Pierre Dandumont before being leaked.

On July 27, 2017, Apple removed the iPod Nano and Shuffle from its stores, marking the end of Apple's production of standalone music players. On May 10, 2022, Apple discontinued the iPod Touch, the last remaining product in the iPod line. iOS 15 was the last iOS release the 7th generation iPod touch received, as future versions from iOS 16 onward no longer support the device.

== Hardware ==
Chipsets and electronics
Chipset or electronic	Product(s)	Component(s)
Microcontroller	iPod Classic 1st to 3rd generations	Two ARM7TDMI-derived cores running at 90 MHz
Microcontroller	iPod Classic 4th and 5th generations, iPod Mini, iPod Nano 1st generation	Variable-speed ARM7TDMI cores, running at a peak of 80 MHz to save battery life
Microcontroller	iPod Classic 6th generation, iPod Nano 2nd generation onwards, iPod Shuffle 2nd generation onwards	Samsung System-on-a-chip, based around an ARM processor.
Microcontroller	iPod Shuffle 1st generation	SigmaTel D-Major STMP3550 chip running at 75 MHz that handles both the music decoding and the audio circuitry.
Microcontroller	iPod Touch 1st and 2nd generation	ARM 1176JZ(F)-S at 412 MHz for 1st gen, 533 MHz for 2nd gen.
Microcontroller	iPod Touch 3rd and 4th generation	ARM Cortex A8 at 600 MHz for 3rd gen, 800 MHz for 4th gen. (Apple A4)
Microcontroller	iPod Touch 5th generation	ARM Cortex A9 at 800 MHz (Apple A5)
Microcontroller	iPod Touch 6th generation	Apple ARMv8-A "Typhoon" at 1.1 GHz (Apple A8) with Apple M8 Motion coprocessor
Microcontroller	iPod Touch 7th generation	Apple ARMv8-A "Hurricane" and "Zephyr" at 1.64 GHz (Apple A10 Fusion) with Apple M10 Motion coprocessor
Audio chip	iPod Classic 1st to 5th generation, iPod Touch 1st generation, iPod Nano 1st to 3rd generation, iPod Mini	Audio Codecs developed by Wolfson Microelectronics
Audio chip	iPod Classic 6th generation, iPod Touch 2nd generation onwards, iPod Shuffle, iPod Nano 4th generation onwards	Cirrus Logic Audio Codec Chip
Video chip	iPod Classic 5th generation	Broadcom BCM2722 VideoCore 2 graphics processor
Storage medium	iPod Classic	45.7 mm (1.8 in) hard drives (ATA-6, 4200 rpm with ZIF connectors) made by Toshiba
Storage medium	iPod Mini	25.4 mm (1 in) Microdrive by Hitachi and Seagate
Storage medium	iPod Nano	Flash memory from Samsung, Toshiba, and others
Storage medium	iPod Shuffle and Touch	Flash memory
Batteries	iPod Classic 1st and 2nd generation	Internal Recyclable Lithium Polymer Batteries
Batteries	iPod Classic 3rd generation onwards, iPod Mini, iPod Nano, iPod Touch, iPod Shuffle	Internal Recyclable Lithium-Ion Batteries
Display	iPod Nano 7th generation	2.5-inch (diagonal) Multi-Touch, 432-by-240 resolution at 202 pixels per inch
Display	iPod Classic 5th and 6th generation	2.5-inch (diagonal) color LCD with LED backlight, 320-by-240 resolution at 163 pixels per inch
Display	iPod Touch 1st to 3rd generation	3.5-inch (diagonal) widescreen Multi-Touch, 480-by-320 resolution at 163 pixels per inch
Display	iPod Touch 4th generation	3.5-inch (diagonal) widescreen Multi-Touch, 960-by-640 resolution at 326 pixels per inch
Display	iPod Touch 5th to 7th generation	4-inch (diagonal) widescreen Multi-Touch, 1136-by-640 resolution at 326 pixels per inch

=== Audio ===
Audio tests showed that the third-generation iPod has a weak bass response. The combination of the undersized DC-blocking capacitors and the typical low impedance of most consumer headphones form a high-pass filter, which attenuates the low-frequency bass output. Similar capacitors were used in the fourth-generation iPods. The problem is reduced when using high-impedance headphones and is completely masked when driving high-impedance (line level) loads, such as when using an external headphone amplifier. The first-generation iPod Shuffle uses a dual-transistor output stage, rather than a single capacitor-coupled output, and does not exhibit reduced bass response for any load.

For all iPods released in 2006 and earlier, some equalizer (EQ) sound settings can easily distort the bass sound, even on undemanding tracks. This occurs when using EQ settings such as R&B, Rock, Acoustic, and Bass Booster, because the equalizer amplifies the digital audio level beyond the software's limit, causing distortion (clipping) on bass instruments.

From the fifth-generation iPod on, Apple introduced a user-configurable volume limit in response to concerns about hearing loss. Users report that in the sixth-generation iPod, the maximum volume output level is limited to 100 dB in EU markets. Apple previously had to remove iPods from shelves in France for exceeding this legal limit. However, users who bought new sixth-generation iPods in late 2013 reported a new option that allowed them to disable the EU volume limit. Some have attributed this change to a software update that shipped with these devices. Older sixth-generation iPods, however, are unable to update to this software version.

=== Connectivity ===
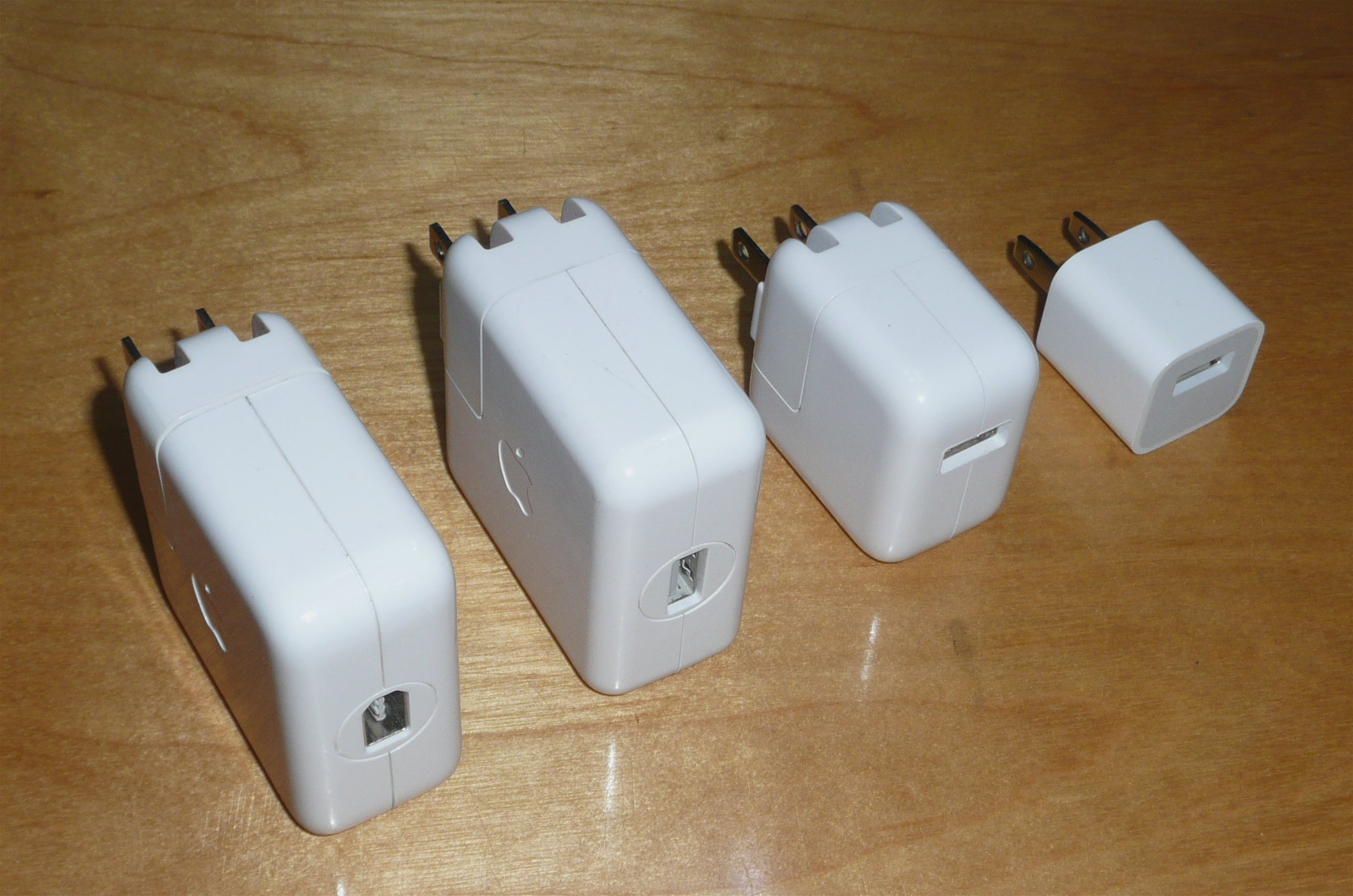
Four iPod wall chargers for North America, all made by Apple. These have FireWire (left two) and USB (right two) connectors, which allow iPods to charge without a computer. The unit second-to-left appears to be a model number A1102 unit. The units have been miniaturized over time.

Originally, a FireWire connection to the host computer was used to update songs or recharge the battery. The battery could also be charged with a power adapter that was included with the first four generations.

The third generation began including a 30-pin dock connector, allowing for FireWire or USB connectivity. This provided better compatibility with non-Apple machines, as most of them did not have FireWire ports at the time. Eventually, Apple began shipping iPods with USB cables instead of FireWire, although the latter was available separately. As of the first-generation iPod Nano and the fifth-generation iPod Classic, Apple discontinued using FireWire for data transfer (while still allowing for use of FireWire to charge the device) in an attempt to reduce cost and form factor. As of the second-generation iPod Touch and the fourth-generation iPod Nano, FireWire charging ability has been removed. The second-generation, third-generation, and fourth-generation iPod Shuffle uses a single 3.5 mm mini jack phone connector which acts as both a headphone jack or a USB data and charging port for the dock/cable.

The dock connector also allowed the iPod to connect to accessories, which often supplement the iPod's music, video, and photo playback. Apple sold a few accessories, such as the now-discontinued iPod Hi-Fi, but most are manufactured by third parties such as Belkin and Griffin. Some peripherals use their own interface, while others use the iPod's own screen. Because the dock connector is a proprietary interface, the implementation of the interface requires paying royalties to Apple.

Apple introduced a new 8-pin dock connector, named Lightning, on September 12, 2012, with their announcement of the iPhone 5, the fifth-generation iPod Touch, and the seventh-generation iPod Nano, which all feature it. The new connector replaces the older 30-pin dock connector used by older iPods, iPhones, and iPads. Apple Lightning cables have pins on both sides of the plug so it can be inserted with either side facing up.

Bluetooth connectivity was added to the last model of the iPod Nano, and Wi-Fi to the iPod Touch.

=== Accessories ===
iPod earbuds.
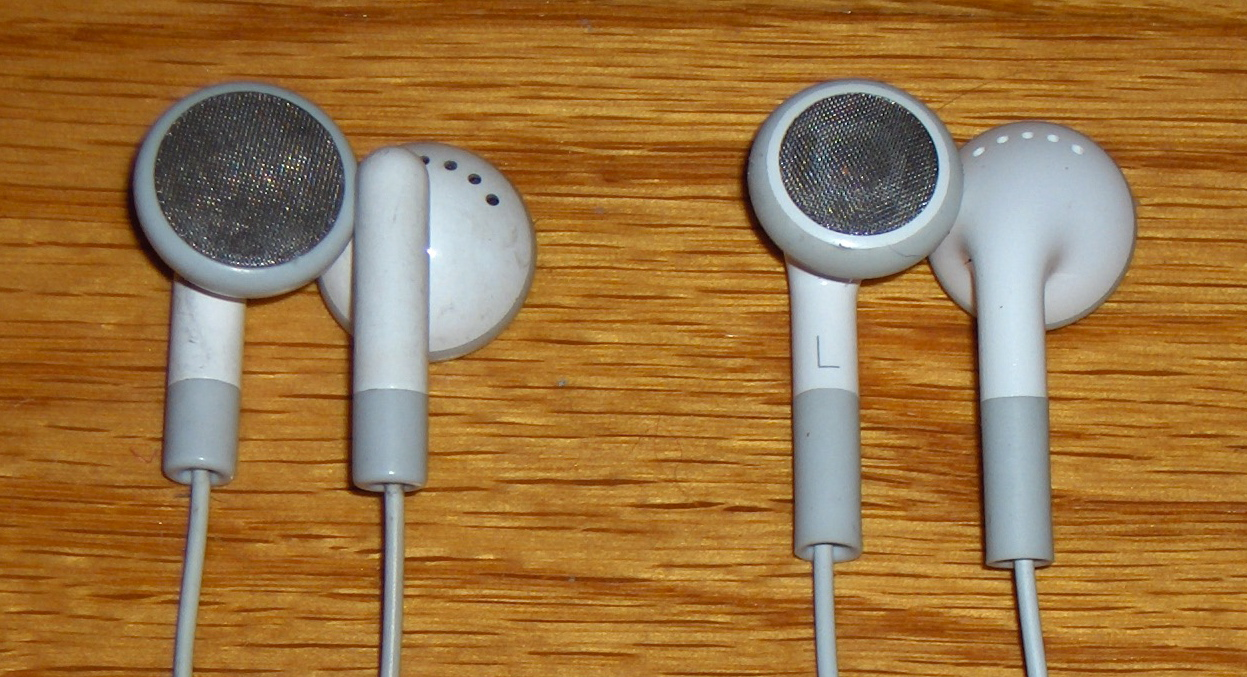
Two early designs of iPod earphones

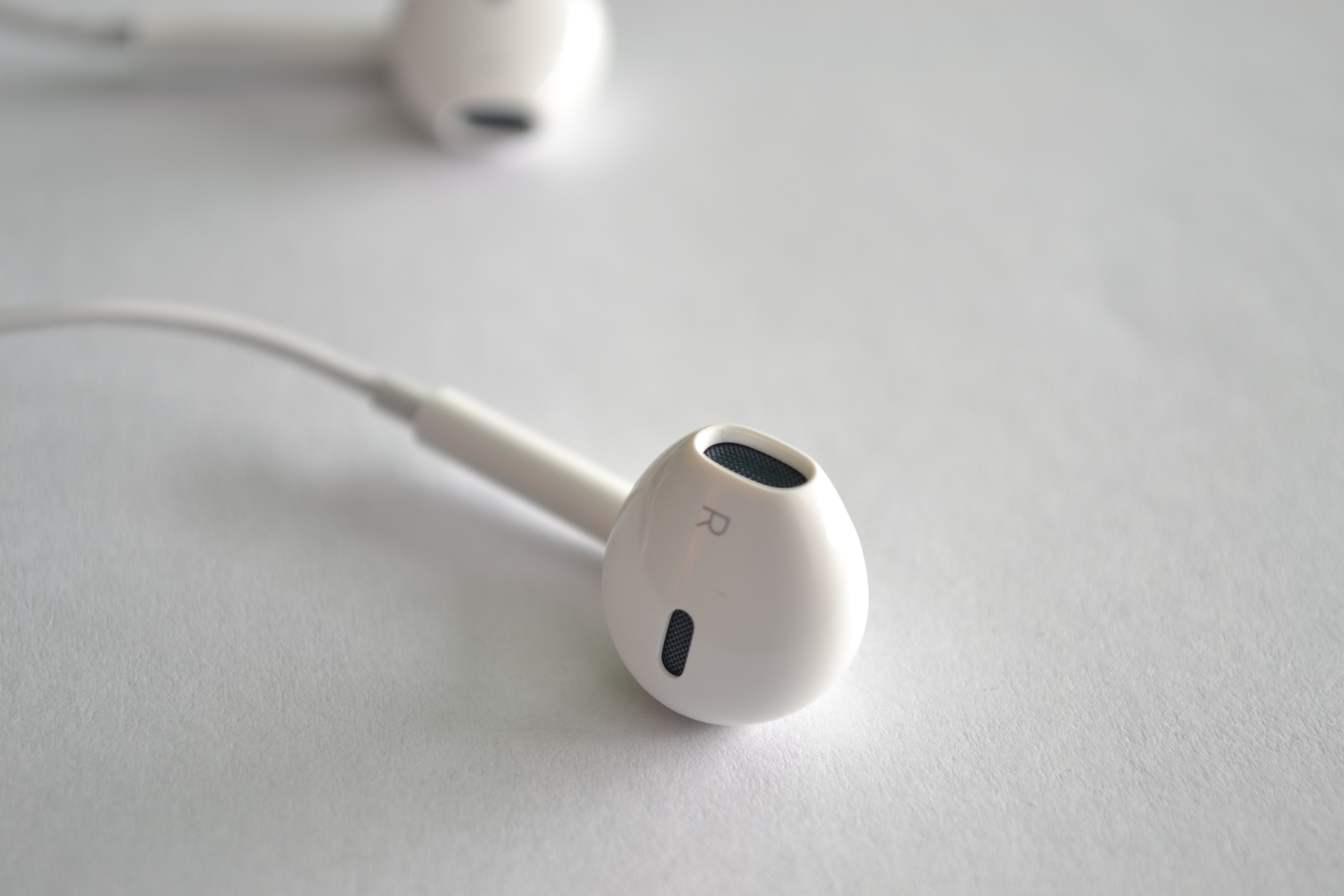
Apple EarPods, introduced 2012.

The "Made for iPod" logo found on most classic iPod accessories.

Many accessories have been made for the iPod line. A large number have been made by third-party companies, although many, such as the iPod Hi-Fi and iPod Socks, have been made by Apple. Some accessories added extra features that other music players have, such as sound recorders, FM radio tuners, wired remote controls, and composite video cables for TV connections. Other accessories offered unique features like the Nike iPod pedometer and the iPod Camera Connector. Other notable accessories included external speakers, wireless remote controls, protective case, screen films, and wireless earphones. Among the first accessory manufacturers were Griffin Technology, Belkin, JBL, Bose, Monster Cable, and SendStation.

BMW released the first iPod automobile interface, allowing drivers of newer BMW vehicles to control an iPod using either the built-in steering wheel controls or the radio head-unit buttons. Apple announced in 2005 that similar systems would be available for other vehicle brands, including Audi, Ferrari, Honda, Mercedes-Benz, Nissan, Toyota, and Volkswagen. Scion offered standard iPod connectivity on all their cars.

Some independent stereo manufacturers including JVC, Pioneer, Kenwood, Alpine, Sony, and Harman Kardon also had iPod-specific integration solutions. Alternative connection methods included adapter kits (that use the cassette deck or the CD changer port), audio input jacks, and FM transmitters such as the iTrip—although personal FM transmitters are illegal in some countries. Many car manufacturers have added audio input jacks as standard.

Beginning in mid-2007, four major airlines, United, Continental, Delta, and Emirates, reached agreements to install iPod seat connections. The free service allowed passengers to power and charge an iPod, and view video and music libraries on individual seat-back displays. Originally, KLM and Air France were reported to be part of the deal with Apple, but they later released statements explaining that they were only contemplating the possibility of incorporating such systems into their aircraft.

== Software ==
The iPod line can play several audio file formats including MP3, AAC/M4A, Protected AAC, AIFF, WAV, Audible audiobook, and Apple Lossless. The iPod Photo introduced the ability to display JPEG, BMP, GIF, TIFF, and PNG image file formats. Fifth- and sixth-generation iPod Classic models, as well as third-generation iPod Nano models, can also play MPEG-4 (H.264/MPEG-4 AVC) and QuickTime video formats, with restrictions on video dimensions, encoding techniques and data rates. (Note: The restrictions vary from generation to generation; for the earliest video iPods, video is required to be Baseline Profile (BP), up to Level 1.3, meaning most significantly no B-frames (BP), a maximum bitrate of 768 kb/s (BP Level 1.3), and a maximum framerate of 30 frame/s at 320×240 resolution. Newer iPods support BP up to level 3.0 (10,000 kb/s), for a maximum framerate of 30 frame/s at 640×480 resolution. Current specifications can be seen at iPod classic Technical Specs, and practical implementations can be seen in the libx264-ipod320.ffpreset and libx264-ipod640.ffpreset preset files for FFmpeg, as discussed in [Ffmpeg-user] Successful ipod h264 encoding Archived August 26, 2010, at the Wayback Machine, by Daniel Rogers, June 11, 2006.) Originally, iPod software only worked with Classic Mac OS and macOS; iPod software for Microsoft Windows was launched with the second-generation model. Unlike most other media players, Apple does not support Microsoft's WMA audio format—but a converter for WMA files without digital rights management (DRM) is provided with the Windows version of iTunes. MIDI files also cannot be played, but can be converted to audio files using the "Advanced" menu in iTunes. Alternative open-source audio formats, such as Ogg Vorbis and FLAC, are not supported without installing custom firmware onto an iPod (e.g., Rockbox).

During installation, an iPod is associated with one host computer. Each time an iPod connects to its host computer, iTunes can synchronize entire music libraries or music playlists either automatically or manually. Song ratings can be set on an iPod and synchronized later to the iTunes library, and vice versa. A user can access, play, and add music on a second computer if an iPod is set to manual and not automatic sync, but anything added or edited will be reversed upon connecting and syncing with the main computer and its library. If a user wishes to automatically sync music with another computer, an iPod's library will be entirely wiped and replaced with the other computer's library.

=== Interface ===
The signature iPod click wheel

iPods with color displays use anti-aliased graphics and text, with sliding animations. All iPods (except the 3rd-generation iPod Shuffle, the 6th & 7th generation iPod Nano, and iPod Touch) have five buttons and the later generations have the buttons integrated into the click wheel – an innovation that gives an uncluttered, minimalist interface. The buttons perform basic functions such as menu, play, pause, next track, and previous track. Other operations, such as scrolling through menu items and controlling the volume, are performed by using the click wheel in a rotational manner. The 3rd-generation iPod Shuffle does not have any controls on the actual player; instead, it has a small control on the earphone cable, with volume-up and -down buttons and a single button for play and pause, next track, etc. The iPod Touch has no click-wheel; instead, it uses a touch screen along with a home button, sleep/wake button, and (on the second and third generations of the iPod Touch) volume-up and -down buttons. The user interface for the iPod Touch is identical to that of the iPhone. Differences include the lack of a phone application and the lack of a SIM card to connect to cellular data. Both devices use iOS.

=== iTunes Store ===
The iTunes Store (introduced April 28, 2003) is an online media store run by Apple and accessed through iTunes. The store became the market leader soon after its launch and Apple announced the sale of videos through the store on October 12, 2005. Full-length movies became available on September 12, 2006.

At the time the store was introduced, purchased audio files used the AAC format with added encryption, based on the FairPlay DRM system. Up to five authorized computers and an unlimited number of iPods could play the files. Burning the files with iTunes as an audio CD, then re-importing would create music files without the DRM. The DRM could also be removed using third-party software. However, in a deal with Apple, EMI began selling DRM-free, higher-quality songs on the iTunes Stores, in a category called "iTunes Plus." While individual songs were made available at a cost of US$1.29, 30¢ more than the cost of a regular DRM song, entire albums were available for the same price, US$9.99, as DRM encoded albums. On October 17, 2007, Apple lowered the cost of individual iTunes Plus songs to US$0.99 per song, the same as DRM encoded tracks. On January 6, 2009, Apple announced that DRM has been removed from 80% of the music catalog and that it would be removed from all music by April 2009.

iPods cannot play music files from competing music stores that use rival-DRM technologies like Microsoft's protected WMA or RealNetworks' Helix DRM. Example stores include Napster and MSN Music. RealNetworks claims that Apple is creating problems for itself by using FairPlay to lock users into using the iTunes Store. Steve Jobs stated that Apple makes little profit from song sales, although Apple uses the store to promote iPod sales. However, iPods can also play music files from online stores that do not use DRM, such as eMusic or Amie Street.

Universal Music Group decided not to renew their contract with the iTunes Store on July 3, 2007. Universal will now supply iTunes in an 'at will' capacity.

Apple debuted the iTunes Wi-Fi Music Store on September 5, 2007, in its Media Event entitled "The Beat Goes On...". This service allows users to access the Music Store from either an iPhone or an iPod Touch and download songs directly to the device that can be synced to the user's iTunes Library over a WiFi connection, or, in the case of an iPhone, the cellular network.

=== Games ===
Video games are playable on various versions of iPods. The original iPod had the game Brick included as an easter egg hidden feature; later firmware versions added it as a menu option. Later revisions of the iPod added three more games: Parachute, Solitaire, and Music Quiz.

Navigate to Extras → Games and, assuming you have a generation 3 (G3) iPod, you will find Brick, Music Quiz, Parachute, and Solitaire. If you have a G1 iPod, only the Breakout game is available, and that only as an Easter egg (a bit of hidden code on the iPod): access it by navigating to the iPod's About screen and holding down the button in the centre of the jog wheel for about five seconds. Breakout will appear on your screen. Then, use the jog wheel to move the racket and play while you listen to your favorite songs.

In September 2006, the iTunes Store began to offer additional games for purchase with the launch of iTunes 7, compatible with the fifth generation iPod with iPod software 1.2 or later. Those games were: Bejeweled, Cubis 2, Mahjong, Mini Golf, Pac-Man, Tetris, Texas Hold 'Em, Vortex, Asphalt 4: Elite Racing and Zuma. Additional games have since been added. These games work on the 5th and 6th generation iPod Classic as well as iPod Nano generations 3rd through 5th.

With third parties like Namco, Square Enix, Electronic Arts, Sega, and Hudson Soft all making games for the iPod, Apple's MP3 player has taken steps towards entering the video game handheld console market. Even video game magazines like GamePro and EGM have reviewed and rated most of their games as of late.

The games are in the form of .ipg files, which are actually .zip archives in disguise. When unzipped, they reveal executable files along with common audio and image files, leading to the possibility of third party games. Apple has not publicly released a software development kit (SDK) for iPod-specific development. Apps produced with the iPhone SDK are compatible only with the iOS on the iPod Touch and iPhone, which cannot run click wheel-based games.

=== File storage and transfer ===
All iPods except for the iPod Touch can function in "disk mode" as mass storage devices to store data files but this has to be manually activated. If an iPod is formatted on a Mac OS computer, it uses the HFS+ file system format, which allows it to serve as a boot disk for a Mac computer. If it is formatted on Windows, the FAT32 format is used. With the release of the Windows-compatible iPod, the default file system used on the iPod line switched from HFS+ to FAT32, although it can be reformatted to either file system (excluding the iPod Shuffle which is strictly FAT32). Generally, if a new iPod (excluding the iPod Shuffle) is initially plugged into a computer running Windows, it will be formatted with FAT32, and if initially plugged into a Mac running Mac OS it will be formatted with HFS+.

Unlike many other MP3 players, simply copying audio or video files to the drive with a typical file management application will not allow an iPod to properly access them. The user must use software that has been specifically designed to transfer media files to iPods so that the files are playable and viewable. Usually iTunes is used to transfer media to an iPod, though several alternative third-party applications are available on a number of different platforms.

iTunes 7 and above can transfer purchased media of the iTunes Store from an iPod to a computer, provided that computer containing the DRM protected media is authorized to play it.

Media files are stored on an iPod in a hidden folder, along with a proprietary database file. The hidden content can be accessed on the host operating system by enabling hidden files to be shown. The media files can then be recovered manually by copying the files or folders off the iPod. Many third-party applications also allow easy copying of media files from an iPod.

== Models and features ==
While the suffix "Classic" was not introduced until the sixth generation, it has been applied here retroactively to all non-suffixed iPods for clarity.

Model	Generation	Image	Capacity	Connection	Original release date	Minimum OS to sync	Rated battery life (hours)		
Classic	1st	1st generation iPod	5, 10 GB	FireWire	November 10, 2001	Mac: 9, 10.1	audio: 10		
Classic	1st	1st generation iPod	First model, with mechanical scroll wheel. 10 GB model released March 20, 2002.						
Classic	2nd	2nd generation iPod (2002).	10, 20 GB	FireWire	August 2002	Mac: 10.1; Win: 2000	audio: 10		
Classic	2nd	2nd generation iPod (2002).	Touch-sensitive wheel. FireWire port had a cover. Hold switch revised. Windows compatibility through Musicmatch.						
Classic	3rd	3rd generation iPod	10, 15, 20, 30, 40 GB	FireWire (USB for syncing only)	May 2, 2003	Mac: 10.1; Win: 2000	audio: 8		
Classic	3rd	3rd generation iPod	First complete redesign with all-touch interface, dock connector, 4-pin remote connector and slimmer case. Musicmatch support dropped with later release of iTunes 4.1 for Windows. 20 and 40 GB variants released on September 8, 2003, to replace the 15 and 30 GB variants.						
Classic	4th (Photo) (with color display)	4th generation iPod.	20, 40 GB	FireWire or USB	July 19, 2004	Mac: 10.2; Win: 2000	audio: 12		
Classic	4th (Photo) (with color display)	4th generation iPod.	Adopted Click Wheel from iPod Mini, added charging through USB in addition to FireWire.						
Classic	4th (Photo) (with color display)	4th generation iPod With Color Display.	photo: 30, 40, 60 GB	FireWire or USB	October 26, 2004	Mac: 10.2; Win: 2000	audio: 15 slideshow: 5		
Classic	4th (Photo) (with color display)	4th generation iPod With Color Display.	color: 20, 60 GB	FireWire or USB	June 28, 2005	Mac: 10.2; Win: 2000	audio: 15 slideshow: 5		
Classic	4th (Photo) (with color display)	4th generation iPod With Color Display.	Premium spin-off of the 4th-generation iPod with color screen, plus picture viewing. Later reintegrated into main iPod line.						
Classic	5th	5th generation iPod.	30, 60, 80 GB	USB (FireWire for charging only)	October 2005	Mac: 10.3; Win: 2000	30 GB audio: 14 video: 2 (later 3.5)		60/80 GB audio: 20 video: 3/6.5
Classic	5th	5th generation iPod.	Second full redesign with a slimmer case, and larger screen with video playback. Remote connector near the headphone jack was omitted as was syncing through FireWire. Offered in black or white. Hardware and firmware updated with 60 GB model replaced with 80 GB model on September 12, 2006, known in the modding and collectibles community as the 5.5th generation.						
Classic	6th	6th generation iPod.	80, 120, 160 GB	USB (FireWire for charging only)	September 5, 2007	Mac: 10.4; Win: XP	80 GB audio: 30 video: 5	120 GB audio: 36 video: 6	160 GB; 2007 model audio: 40 video: 7; 2009 model audio: 36 video: 6
Classic	6th	6th generation iPod.	Introduced the "Classic" suffix. New interface and anodized aluminum front plate. Silver replaces white. In September 2008 the hardware and firmware was updated with a 120 GB model replacing the 80 GB model and the 160 GB model was discontinued. In September 2009, the 120 GB model was replaced with a 160 GB model. Discontinued on September 9, 2014.						
Mini	1st	1st generation iPod Mini.	4 GB	USB or FireWire	February 20, 2004	Mac: 10.1; Win: 2000	audio: 8		
Mini	1st	1st generation iPod Mini.	New smaller model, available in 5 colors. Introduced the "Click Wheel".						
Mini	2nd	2nd generation iPod Mini.	4, 6 GB	USB or FireWire	February 23, 2005	Mac: 10.2; Win: 2000	audio: 18		
Mini	2nd	2nd generation iPod Mini.	Brighter color variants with longer battery life. Click Wheel lettering matched body color. Gold color discontinued. Later replaced by iPod Nano.						
Nano	1st	1st generation iPod Nano.	1, 2, 4 GB	USB (FireWire for charging only)	September 7, 2005	Mac: 10.3; Win: 2000	audio: 14 slideshow: 4		
Nano	1st	1st generation iPod Nano.	Replaced Mini. Available in black or white and used flash memory. Color screen for picture viewing. 1 GB version released later.						
Nano	2nd	4 GB silver iPod Nano	2, 4, 8 GB	USB (FireWire for charging only)	September 12, 2006	Mac: 10.3; Win: 2000	audio: 24 slideshow: 5		
Nano	2nd	4 GB silver iPod Nano	Anodized aluminum casing and 6 colors available.						
Nano	3rd	4 GB 3rd generation iPod Nano.	4, 8 GB	USB (FireWire for charging only)	September 5, 2007	Mac: 10.4; Win: XP	audio: 24 video: 5		
Nano	3rd	4 GB 3rd generation iPod Nano.	2" QVGA screen, colors refreshed with chrome back, new interface, video capability, smaller Click Wheel.						
Nano	4th	16 GB Flash Drive 4th generation iPod Nano.	4, 8, 16 GB	USB	September 9, 2008	Mac: 10.4; Win: XP	audio: 24 video: 4		
Nano	4th	16 GB Flash Drive 4th generation iPod Nano.	Reverted to tall form factor and all-aluminum enclosure with nine color choices, added accelerometer for "shake to shuffle" functionality and horizontal viewing. 4 GB model limited release in selected markets.						
Nano	5th	16 GB Flash Drive 5th generation iPod Nano with camera.	8, 16 GB	USB	September 9, 2009	Mac: 10.4; Win: XP	audio: 24 video: 5		
Nano	5th	16 GB Flash Drive 5th generation iPod Nano with camera.	First iPod to include a video camera; also included a larger screen, FM radio, speaker, pedometer, and a polished exterior case while retaining similar colors to the 4th generation model.						
Nano	6th	Silver 6th generation iPod Nano	8, 16 GB	USB	September 1, 2010	Mac: 10.5; Win: XP	audio: 24		
Nano	6th	Silver 6th generation iPod Nano	First iPod Nano to include multi-touch screen; clip from iPod Shuffle added. Video playback, speakers and camera removed.						
Nano	7th	Black 7th generation iPod Nano.	16 GB	USB	September 12, 2012	Mac: 10.6; Win: XP	audio: 30 video: 3.5		
Nano	7th	Black 7th generation iPod Nano.	Reverted to tall form factor with larger 2.5" multi-touch screen. Clip removed. Video playback restored and Bluetooth added. Replaced 30-pin dock connector with new Lightning connector. Discontinued July 27, 2017.						
Shuffle	1st	1st generation iPod Shuffle.	512 MB, 1 GB	USB (no adaptor required)	January 11, 2005	Mac: 10.2; Win: 2000	audio: 12		
Shuffle	1st	1st generation iPod Shuffle.	New entry-level model. Uses flash memory and has no screen.						
Shuffle	2nd	2nd generation iPod Shuffle	1, 2 GB	USB	September 12, 2006	Mac: 10.3; Win: 2000	audio: 12		
Shuffle	2nd	2nd generation iPod Shuffle	Smaller clip design with anodized aluminum casing. 4 color options added later. Colors were changed in 2007 and 2008.						
Shuffle	3rd	3rd generation iPod Shuffle	2, 4 GB	USB	March 11, 2009	Mac: 10.4; Win: XP	audio: 10		
Shuffle	3rd	3rd generation iPod Shuffle	Smaller design with controls relocated to right earbud cable. Introduced with two colors, and featured VoiceOver. More colors and 2 GB model added in September 2009.						
Shuffle	4th	4th generation iPod Shuffle.	2 GB	USB	September 1, 2010	Mac: 10.5; Win: XP	audio: 15		
Shuffle	4th	4th generation iPod Shuffle.	Controls returned to the body of the iPod. Introduced with five colors, and featured VoiceOver. Discontinued July 27, 2017.						
Touch	1st	1st generation iPod Touch.	8, 16, 32 GB	USB (FireWire for charging only)	September 5, 2007	Mac: 10.4; Win: XP	audio: 22 video: 5		
Touch	1st	1st generation iPod Touch.	First iPod with Wi-Fi and a Multi-touch interface. Features Safari browser and wireless access to the iTunes Store and YouTube. 32 GB model later added. iPhoneOS 2.0 with the App Store access required an upgrade fee.						
Touch	2nd	2nd generation iPod Touch.	8, 16, 32 GB	USB	September 9, 2008	Mac: 10.4; Win: XP	audio: 36 video: 6		
Touch	2nd	2nd generation iPod Touch.	New tapered chrome back with Nike+ functionality, volume buttons, and built-in speaker added. iPhoneOS 2.0 and App Store access standard. Bluetooth support added but not made active until iPhoneOS 3.0, which required an upgrade fee.						
Touch	3rd	2nd generation iPod Touch.	32, 64 GB	USB	September 9, 2009	Mac: 10.4; Win: XP	audio: 30 video: 6		
Touch	3rd	2nd generation iPod Touch.	Updated to include the upgraded internals from the iPhone 3GS; included Voice Control support and bundled remote earphones.						
Touch	4th	4th generation iPod Touch.	8, 16, 32, 64 GB	USB	September 1, 2010	Mac: 10.5; Win: XP	audio: 40 video: 7		
Touch	4th	4th generation iPod Touch.	New thinner design including two cameras for FaceTime and HD video recording, hold button moved to top right corner, Retina Display similar to iPhone 4, Apple A4 chip. White-colored version added on October 4, 2011.						
Touch	5th	5th generation iPod Touch.	16, 32, 64 GB	USB (over Lightning)	September 12, 2012	Mac: 10.6; Win: XP	audio: 40 video: 8		
Touch	5th	5th generation iPod Touch.	New aluminum design with colored case options. Featured improved cameras along with A5 processor, Siri, and taller 4" Retina Display. First 16 GB models released have no color choices and no iSight camera, In early 2014 16 GB models were released that featured iSight cameras and color choices.						
Touch	6th	6th and 7th generation iPod Touch.	16, 32, 64, 128 GB	USB (over Lightning)	July 15, 2015	Mac: 10.7; Win: 7	audio: 40 video: 8		
Touch	6th	6th and 7th generation iPod Touch.	Updated with a new lineup of six colors, a new 128 GB model, and improved internals. The improved internals feature new cameras and the A8 processor with M8 motion coprocessor, 1 GB of RAM (twice the amount of the previous generation), and 802.11ac Wi-Fi.						
Touch	7th	6th and 7th generation iPod Touch.	32, 128, 256 GB	USB (over Lightning)	May 28, 2019	Mac: 10.11.4; Win: 7	audio: 40 video: 8		
Touch	7th	6th and 7th generation iPod Touch.	Updated with a new 256 GB model, and an upgraded SoC from the A8 to the A10 Fusion. Also added support for features not previously supported on the 6th generation iPod touch, like AR and Group FaceTime. Discontinued May 10, 2022.						
Sources: Apple Inc., Mactracker

== Patent disputes ==
In 2005, Apple faced two lawsuits claiming patent infringement by the iPod line and its associated technologies: Advanced Audio Devices claimed the iPod line breached its patent on a "music jukebox", while a Hong Kong-based IP portfolio company called Pat-rights filed a suit claiming that Apple's FairPlay technology breached a patent issued to inventor Ho Keung Tse. The latter case also includes the online music stores of Sony, RealNetworks, Napster, and Musicmatch as defendants.

Apple's application to the United States Patent and Trademark Office for a patent on "rotational user inputs", as used on the iPod interface, received a third "non-final rejection" (NFR) in August 2005. Also in August 2005, Creative Technology, one of Apple's main rivals in the MP3 player market, announced that it held a patent on part of the music selection interface used by the iPod line, which Creative Technology dubbed the "Zen Patent", granted on August 9, 2005. On May 15, 2006, Creative filed another suit against Apple with the United States District Court for the Northern District of California. Creative also asked the United States International Trade Commission to investigate whether Apple was breaching U.S. trade laws by importing iPods into the United States.

On August 24, 2006, Apple and Creative announced a broad settlement to end their legal disputes. Apple will pay Creative US$100 million for a paid-up license, to use Creative's awarded patent in all Apple products. As part of the agreement, Apple will recoup part of its payment, if Creative is successful in licensing the patent. Creative then announced its intention to produce iPod accessories by joining the Made for iPod program.

== Sales ==
iPod quarterly sales. Click for table of data and sources. Note that Q1 is October through December of previous year, the holiday season.

Sales of iPods peaked in Q1 2009, following rapid growth in the period of 2005 to 2007 and slow growth in 2008.

In January 2007, Apple reported record quarterly revenue of US$7.1 billion, of which 48% was made from iPod sales. On April 9, 2007, it was announced that Apple had sold its one-hundred millionth iPod, making it the best-selling digital music player of all time. Its second-quarter revenue of US$5.2 billion, of which 32% was made from iPod sales. Apple and several industry analysts suggest that iPod users are likely to purchase other Apple products such as Mac computers. 42% of Apple's revenue for the First fiscal quarter of 2008 came from iPod sales (followed by 21% from notebook sales and 16% from desktop sales).

On October 21, 2008, Apple reported that only 14.21% of total revenue for fiscal quarter 4 of the year 2008 came from iPods. At the September 9, 2009 keynote presentation at the Apple Event, Phil Schiller announced total cumulative sales of iPods exceeded 220 million. The continual decline of iPod sales since 2009 has not been a surprising trend for the Apple corporation, as Apple CFO Peter Oppenheimer explained in June 2009: "We expect our traditional MP3 players to decline over time as we cannibalize ourselves with the iPod Touch and the iPhone." Since 2009, the company's iPod sales have continually decreased every financial quarter and in 2013 a new model was not introduced onto the market.

As of September 2012, Apple reported that total number of iPods sold worldwide was 350 million.

=== Market share ===
Since October 2004, the iPod line has dominated digital music player sales in the United States, with over 90% of the market for hard-drive-based players and over 70% of the market for all types of players. During the year from January 2004 to January 2005, the high rate of sales caused its U.S. market share to increase from 31% to 65%, and in July 2005, this market share was measured at 74%. In January 2007, according to Bloomberg Online, the iPod market share reached 72.7%. In the Japanese market, iPod market share was 36% in 2005; nonetheless, it was still a market leader in the country. In Europe, Apple also led the market (especially the UK); however, local brands such as Archos managed to outsell Apple in certain categories.

One of the reasons for the iPod's early success, having been released three years after the very first digital audio player (namely the MPMan), was its seamless integration with the company's iTunes software, and the ecosystem built around it such as the iTunes Music Store, as well as a competitive price. As a result, Apple achieved a dominance in the MP3 player market as Sony's Walkman did with personal cassette players two decades earlier. The software similarity between computer and player made it easy to transfer music over and synchronize it, tasks that were considered difficult on pre-iPod MP3 players such as those from Rio and Creative.

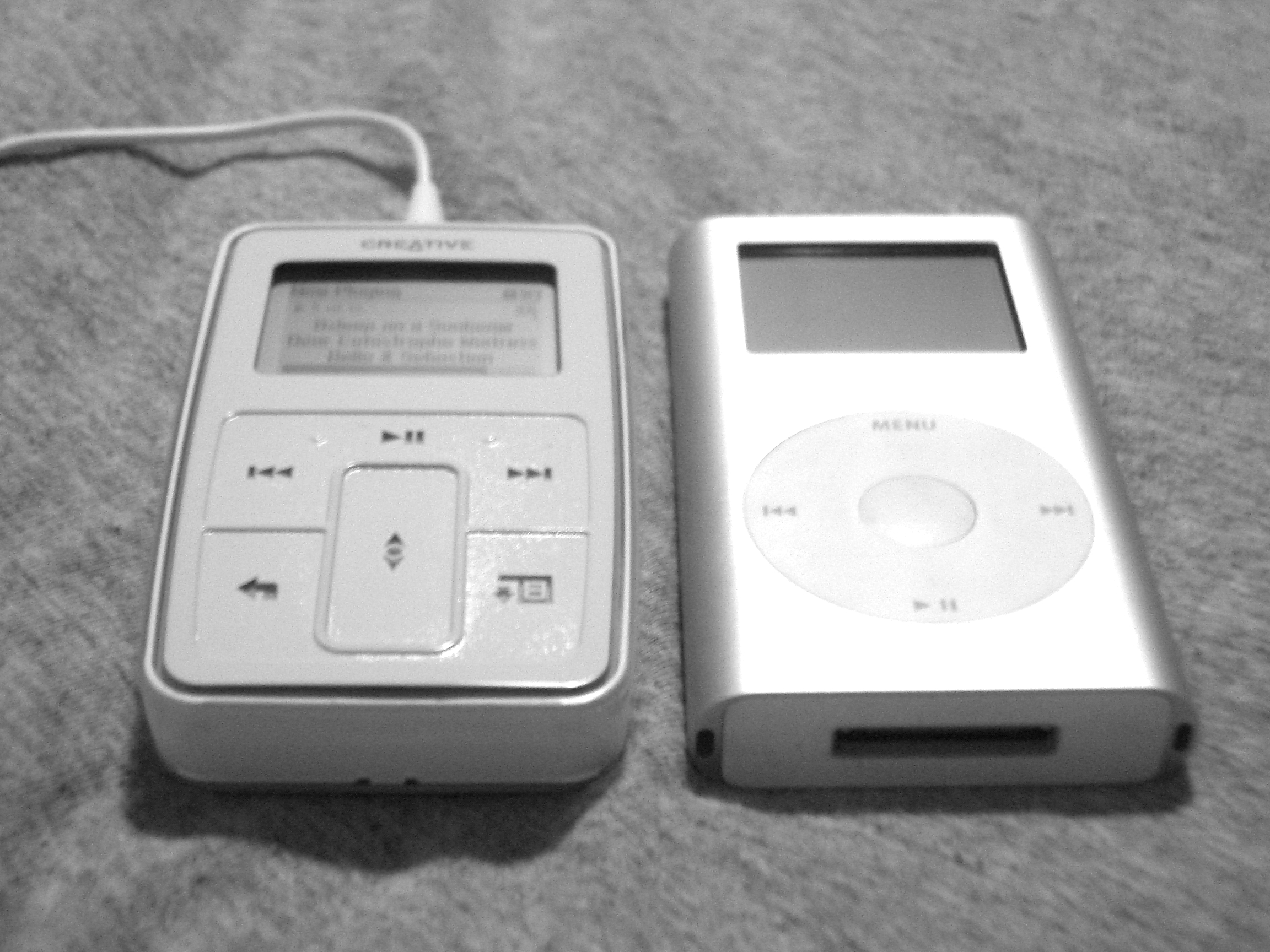
Comparison of iPod Mini (right) and a competitor Creative Zen Micro (left)

Some of the iPod's chief competitors at its pinnacle include Creative's Zen, SanDisk's Sansa, Sony's Walkman, iriver, and Samsung's Yepp. The iPod's dominance was challenged numerous times: in 2004 Sony's first hard disk Walkman was designed to take on the iPod, accompanied by its own music store Sony Connect; Microsoft initially attempted to compete using a software platform called Portable Media Center, and in later years designed the Zune line; the most vocal rival was Creative, whose CEO in November 2004 "declared war" on the iPod. Samsung declared that they would take the top spot from Apple by 2007, while SanDisk ran a specific anti-iPod marketing campaign called iDon't. These competitors failed to make major dents, and Apple remained dominant in the fast-growing digital audio player market during the decade. Mobile phone manufacturers Nokia and Sony Ericsson also made "music phones" to rival iPod.

A suggested factor of iPod's popularity has been cited to be Apple's popular iTunes Store catalog, playing a part in keeping Apple firmly market leader, while also helped by the mismanagement of others, such as Sony's unpopular SonicStage software.

One notable exception where iPod was not faring well was in South Korea. As of 2005, Apple held a market share of less than 2%, compared to market leaders iriver, Samsung and Cowon.

As of 2011, iPod held a 70% market share in global MP3 players. Its closest competitor was noted to be the Sansa line from SanDisk.

== Industry impact ==
iPods often received favorable reviews; scoring high on looks, clean design, and ease of use. PC World wrote that iPod line has "altered the landscape for portable audio players".

The iPod has also been credited with accelerating shifts within the music industry. The iPod's popularization of digital music storage allows users to abandon listening to entire albums and instead be able to choose specific singles which hastened the end of the album era in popular music.

== Criticism ==
=== Headphone usage ===
As with any device capable of outputting to a pair of headphones, an iPod turned up to an excessive volume can cause noise-induced hearing loss. Since users often turn the volume up to compensate for background noise, a study found that headphone users who listen in noisy environments are at risk for permanent gradual hearing damage.

People have expressed concerns about users, especially young people, being more prone to developing hearing loss from iPods in particular. Some iPods and their headphones can reach sound pressure levels of 115 decibels, and the iPod and included materials do not contain much information about the risks of hearing loss or what a safe volume and/or duration can entail. People would often have misconceptions about what a safe level is, assuming that a dangerous device would not be sold, that only maximum volume causes deafness, or that sound needs to be painful or literally "hurt your ears" to be deafening.

Even if users listen at a moderately loud volume (85dBA or louder), an iPod battery lasts longer and is cheaper to charge than it is to replace the batteries of a Walkman, meaning that the longer duration can make even medium-loud sounds (85 dB) dangerous. Apple has since adjusted their devices to only output sounds up to 100 dB, which is still deafening over a longer duration, but not quite as loud. Listening at a low volume is generally considered safe.

=== Battery problems ===
The advertised battery life on most models is different from the real-world achievable life. For example, the fifth-generation 30 GB iPod Classic was advertised as having up to 14 hours of music playback. However, an MP3.com report stated that this was virtually unachievable under real-life usage conditions, with a writer for the site getting, on average, less than 8 hours from an iPod. In 2003, class action lawsuits were brought against Apple complaining that the battery charges lasted for shorter lengths of time than stated and that the battery degraded over time. The lawsuits were settled by offering individuals with first- or second-generation iPods either US$50 store credit or a free battery replacement, and offering individuals with third-generation iPods an extended warranty that would allow them to get a replacement iPod if they experienced battery problems.

As an instance of planned obsolescence, iPod batteries are not designed to be removed or replaced by the user, although some users have been able to open the case themselves, usually following instructions from third-party vendors of iPod replacement batteries. Compounding the problem, Apple initially would not replace worn-out batteries. The official policy was that the customer should buy a refurbished replacement iPod, at a cost almost equivalent to a brand new one. All lithium-ion batteries lose capacity during their lifetime even when not in use (guidelines are available for prolonging life-span) and this situation led to a market for third-party battery replacement kits.

Apple announced a battery replacement program on November 14, 2003, a week before a high publicity stunt and website by the Neistat Brothers. The initial cost was US$99, and it was lowered to US$59 in 2005. One week later, Apple offered an extended iPod warranty for US$59. For the iPod Nano, soldering tools are needed because the battery is soldered onto the main board. Fifth generation iPods have their battery attached to the backplate with adhesive.

The first generation iPod Nano may overheat and pose a health and safety risk. Affected iPod Nanos were sold between September 2005 and December 2006. This is due to a flawed battery used by Apple from a single battery manufacturer. Apple recommended that owners of affected iPod Nanos stop using them. Under an Apple product replacement program, affected Nanos were replaced with current generation Nanos free of charge.

=== Reliability and durability ===
iPods have been criticized for alleged short lifespan and fragile hard drives. A 2005 survey conducted on the MacInTouch website found that the iPod line had an average failure rate of 13.7% (although they note that comments from respondents indicate that "the true iPod failure rate may be lower than it appears"). It concluded that some models were more durable than others. In particular, failure rates for iPods employing hard drives were usually above 20% while those with flash memory had a failure rate below 10%. In late 2005, many users complained that the surface of the first-generation iPod Nano can become scratched easily, rendering the screen unusable. A class-action lawsuit was also filed. Apple initially considered the issue a minor defect, but later began shipping these iPods with protective sleeves.

=== Labor disputes ===
On June 11, 2006, the British tabloid The Mail on Sunday reported that iPods are mainly manufactured by workers who earn no more than US$50 per month and work 15-hour shifts. Apple investigated the case with independent auditors and found that, while some of the plant's labor practices met Apple's Code of Conduct, others did not: employees worked over 60 hours a week for 35% of the time and worked more than six consecutive days for 25% of the time.

Foxconn, Apple's manufacturer, initially denied the abuses, but when an auditing team from Apple found that workers had been working longer hours than were allowed under Chinese law, they promised to prevent workers working more hours than the code allowed. Apple hired a workplace standards auditing company, Verité, and joined the Electronic Industry Code of Conduct Implementation Group to oversee the measures. On December 31, 2006, workers at the Foxconn factory in Longhua, Shenzhen formed a union affiliated with the All-China Federation of Trade Unions, the Chinese government-approved union umbrella organization.

In 2010, a number of workers committed suicide at a Foxconn operations in China. Apple, HP, and others stated that they were investigating the situation. Foxconn guards have been videotaped beating employees. Another employee killed himself in 2009 when an Apple prototype went missing, and claimed in messages to friends, that he had been beaten and interrogated.

As of 2006, the iPod was produced by about 14,000 workers in the U.S. and 27,000 overseas. Further, the salaries attributed to this product were overwhelmingly distributed to highly skilled U.S. professionals, as opposed to lower-skilled U.S. retail employees or overseas manufacturing labor. One interpretation of this result is that U.S. innovation can create more jobs overseas than domestically.

== Timeline of models ==
Timeline of iPod models
Sources: Apple press release library, Mactracker Apple Inc. model database

== See also ==
- iPhone
- Motorola Rokr E1
- Podcast
- iPad
