= IPod+HP =

Line of HP-branded iPods

iPod+HP
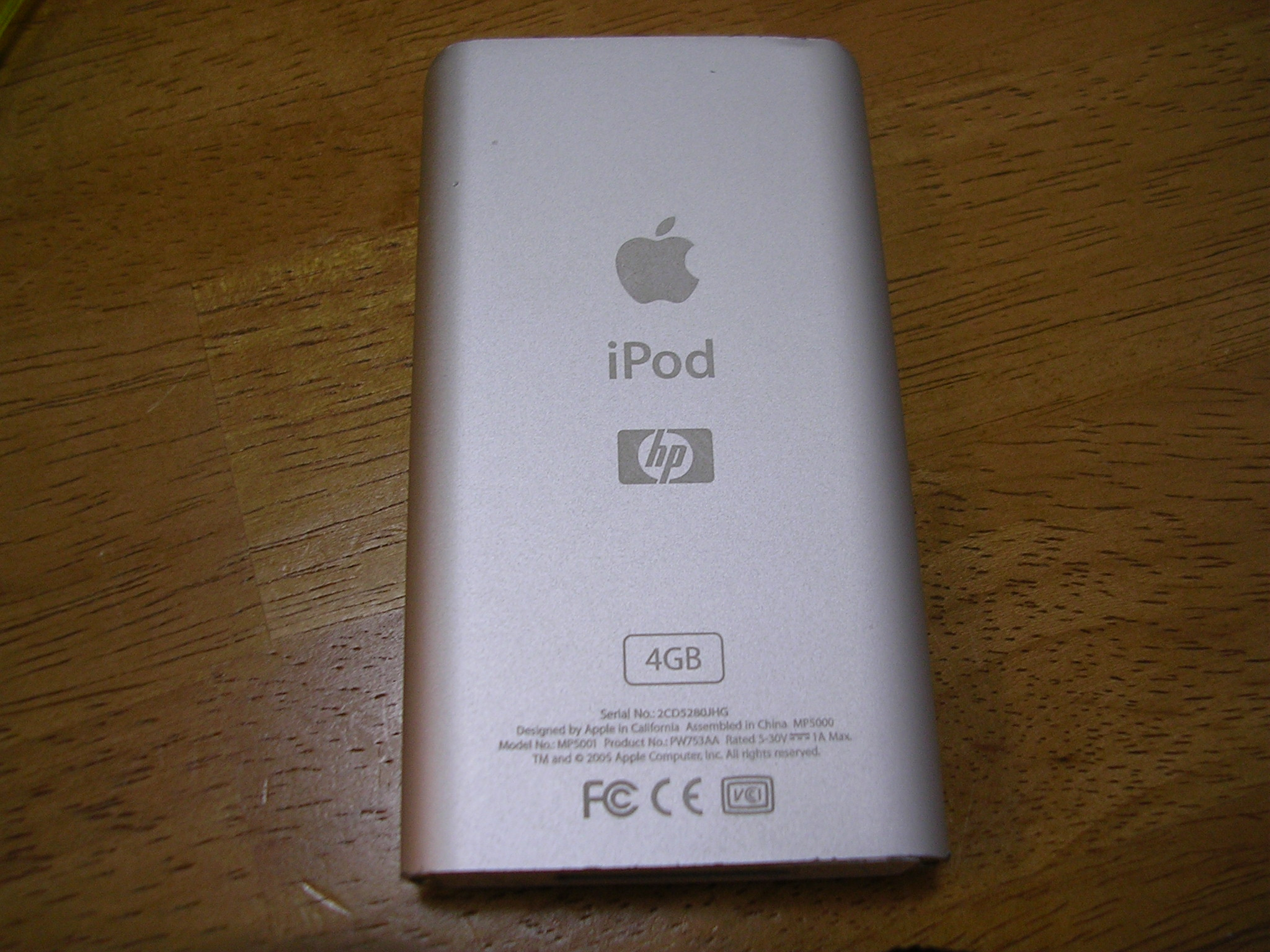
- An iPod mini with HP branding
- Developer: Apple
- Type: Portable media player
- Released: January 8, 2004
- Discontinued: July 29, 2005
- Related: iPod (4th generation); iPod mini; iPod photo; iPod shuffle (1st generation)

The Apple iPod+HP was a line of Hewlett-Packard–branded iPods, distributed through HP.

On January 8, 2004, then-CEO of HP Carly Fiorina announced the Apple iPod+HP deal at the Consumer Electronics Show. As part of the deal, Apple was to have its iPod manufactured for HP and iTunes would be pre-installed on all HP Pavilion and Compaq Presario computers. The first device in the iPod+HP line was the fourth-generation iPod, available in 20 and 40 GB of storage. The Apple iPod+HP was originally intended to be available in "HP Blue" to complement the color of its home computers.

HP later added the iPod mini, the iPod photo, and the iPod shuffle to the lineup. As these were officially HP products rather than Apple products, Apple Store Genius Bars were not authorized to repair Apple iPod+HP iPods, and they had to be sent to an HP Authorized Service Center for repair, despite identical designs.

== Deal termination ==
On July 29, 2005, following Fiorina's forced resignation, HP announced that it would terminate its deal with Apple. Even though the deal was terminated, part of the deal prevented HP from making a rival digital music player (MP3 player) until August 2006. HP continued to pre-install iTunes on home computers until January 6, 2006, when HP announced a partnership with RealNetworks to install Rhapsody on HP- and Compaq-branded home computers.
