= IPod Shuffle =

Digital audio player by Apple (2005–2017)

iPod shuffle
- iPod Shuffle 4th generation in Silver
- Manufacturer: Apple
- Product family: iPod
- Type: Digital audio player
- Lifespan: January 11, 2005 – July 27, 2017 (12 years, 6 months)
- Discontinued: July 27, 2017
- Media: Flash memory 512 MB to 4 GB
- Operating system: 1.1.5 (1G); 1.0.4 (2G); 1.1 (3G); 1.0.3 (4G)
- Display: None
- Input: Shuffle, Play In Order, Turn Off, 3.5-mm stereo headphone jack
- Connectivity: USB 2.0 (1G Directly)
- Power: Lithium-ion battery
- Weight: 12.5 grams (0.44 oz)
- Successor: iPod Touch
- Related: iPod Nano iPod Mini iPod Classic iPod Touch

The iPod Shuffle (stylized and marketed as iPod shuffle) is a discontinued digital audio player designed and formerly marketed by Apple. It was the smallest model in Apple's iPod family, and was the first to use flash memory. The first model was announced at the Macworld Conference & Expo on January 11, 2005; the fourth- and final-generation models were introduced on September 1, 2010. The iPod Shuffle was discontinued by Apple on July 27, 2017.

== Overview ==
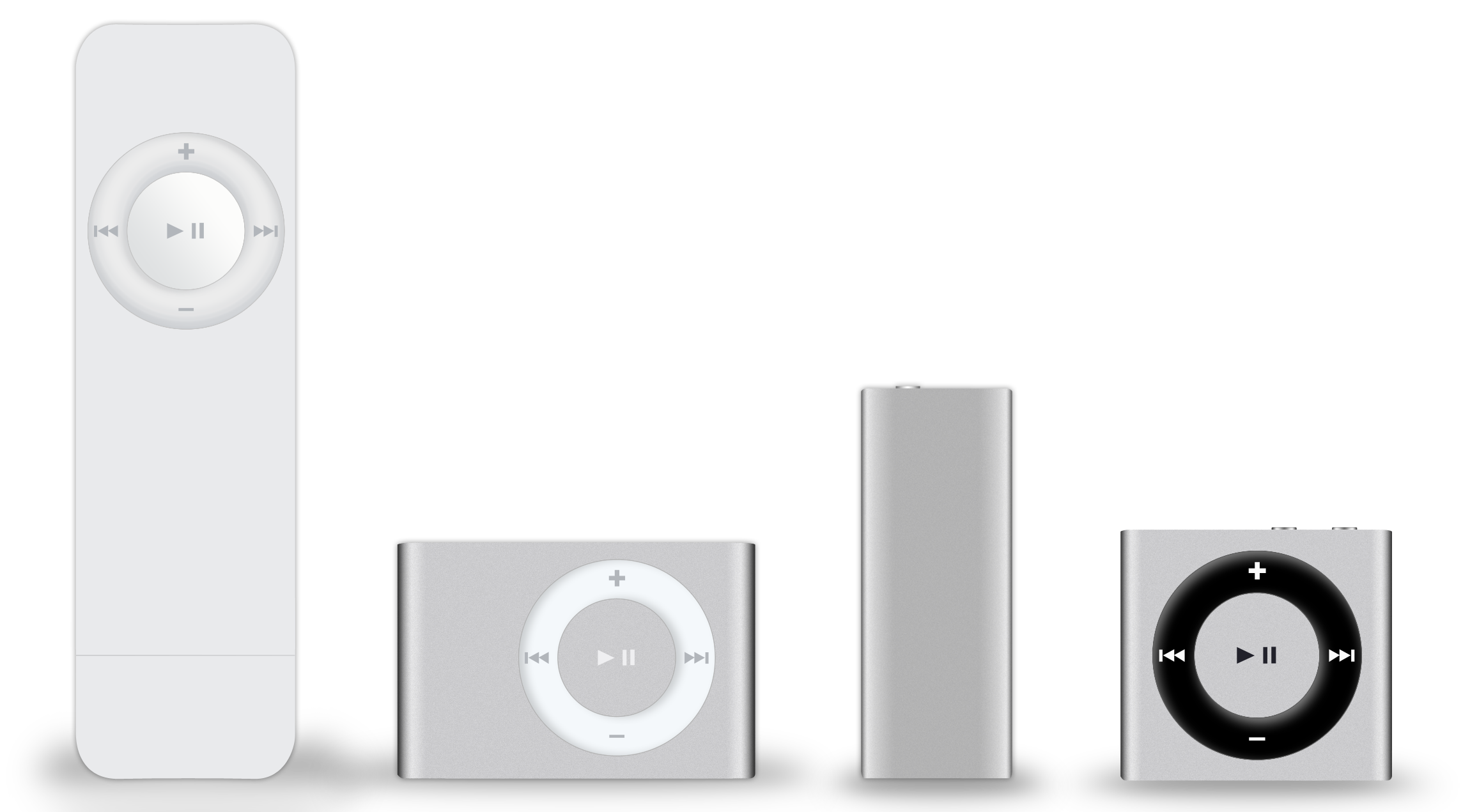
The four generations of the iPod Shuffle

=== 1st generation ===
Released on January 11, 2005, during the Macworld expo, the first-generation iPod Shuffle weighs 0.78 ounces (22 g), resembles a pack of chewing gum sticks, and was designed to be easily loaded with a selection of songs and to play them in sequential or random order.

It is based on the SigmaTel STMP35xx system on a chip (SOC) and its software development kit (SDK) v2.6, a flash memory IC, and a USB-rechargeable lithium cell. The STMP35xx SOC and its software was the most fully integrated portable MP3 playback at release time and SigmaTel was Austin's largest IPO (2003) capturing over 60% of flash based MP3 player world market share in 2004. In 2005, peak iPod first-generation Shuffle production occurred at a hundred thousand units per day, at the Asus factory.

It lacks a display, click wheel, playlist management features, and the games, address book, calendar, alarm, and notes capability of larger iPods. Due to the formats not being ported, it is incapable of playing Apple Lossless and AIFF audio files. The iPod Shuffle series also lacks a real-time clock; therefore, it does not update the "Last Played" value in iTunes.

The 1 GB model was advertised as capable of holding up to 240 songs (based on Apple's estimate of four minutes per song and 128 kbit/s AAC encoding). To cater to the limited capacity and intended usage scenario, two new features were added to iTunes: AutoFill, available as a supplement or replacement to manual selection, which selects songs at random from a user's music library (or from a specific playlist) and copies as many as would fit into the iPod Shuffle's storage; and an option to automatically transcode audio files of higher specifications to 128 kbit/s AAC-LC while transferring them (which would remain exclusive to the iPod Shuffle series until iTunes 9.1). Furthermore, older versions of iTunes allowed an iPod Shuffle playlist to be viewed and changed while the unit is not connected; changes would be synchronized the next time the unit is connected. However, this functionality was removed in iTunes 7.

Due to superior audio technology in the SigmaTel STMP35xx SOC and SDK, the first generation had a better bass response than a fourth-generation iPod, according to a review published days after its release.

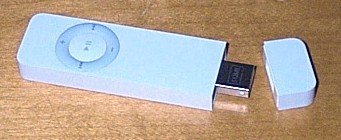
First-generation iPod Shuffle with the cap removed to show the USB connector. The cap snaps onto the unit. The iPod Shuffle comes with a second cap on a lanyard, which a user can wear around their neck.

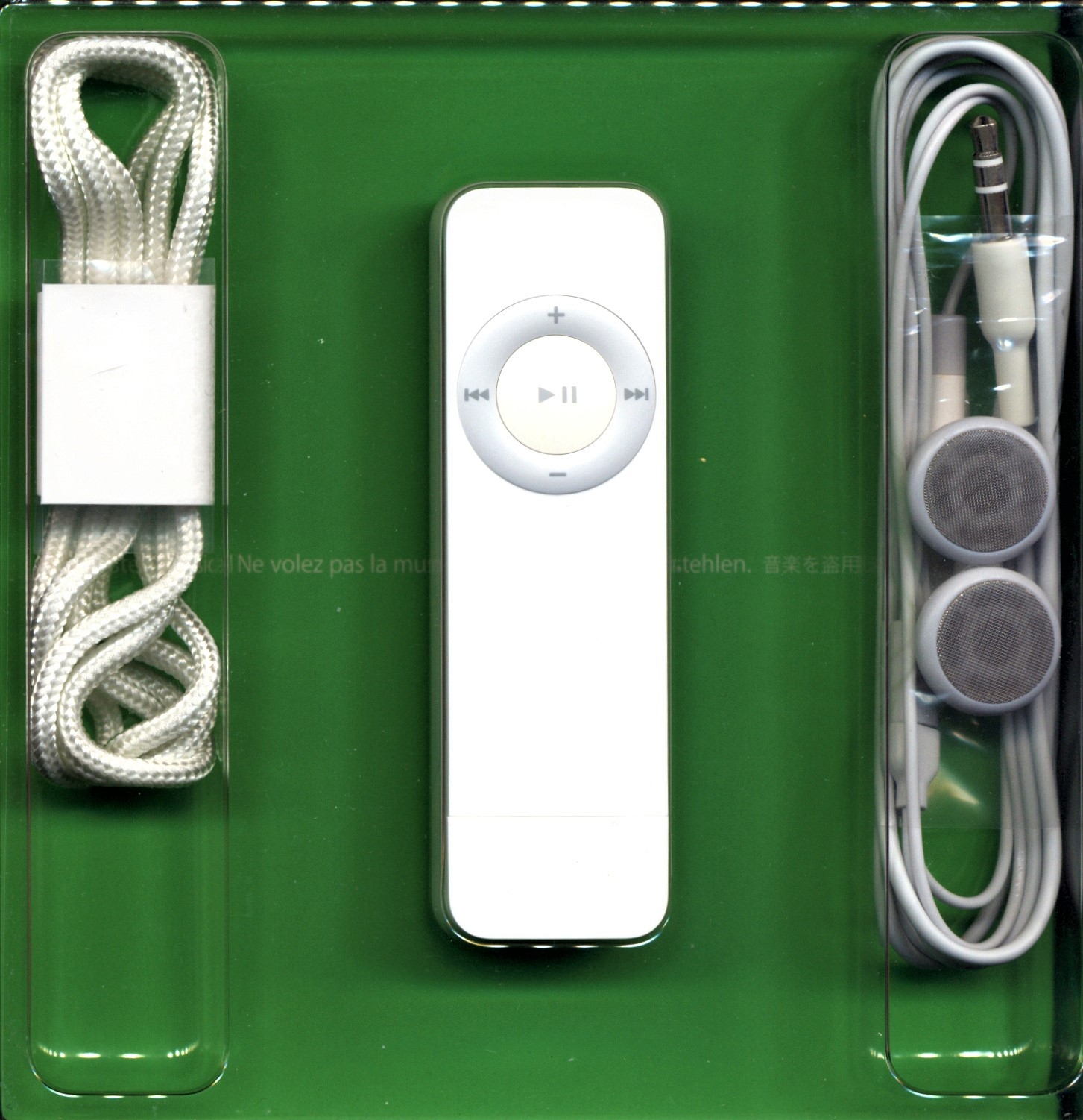
First-generation iPod Shuffle in its packaging

The front of the iPod Shuffle features an array of buttons, marketed as Control Pad, for Play/Pause, Next Song/Fast Forward, Previous Song/Fast Reverse, and up and down volume adjustment, as well as a concealed status LED. On the reverse, it features a battery level indicator light (activated by a button) and a three-position switch that can turn the unit off, set it to play music in order, or set the music to shuffled. It plugs directly into a computer's USB port (either 1.1 or 2.0), through which it also recharges its battery, which has an expected life of around 12 hours. The USB plug has additional pins capable of audio output for proprietary accessories and, when not in use, can be hidden beneath a cap. A second cap, included with the unit, has a lanyard attached which allows the iPod Shuffle to hang around the user's neck.

As both already supported by its larger relatives and suggested by its design, the Shuffle can also be used as a USB flash drive – a feature further facilitated by the dropping of "Macintosh" (HFS Plus) format: all Shuffles are formatted to FAT32 regardless of the operating system used for restoring them. iTunes also allowed users to reserve part of the capacity for storing files, by limiting the space that would be used for storing music.

=== 2nd generation ===
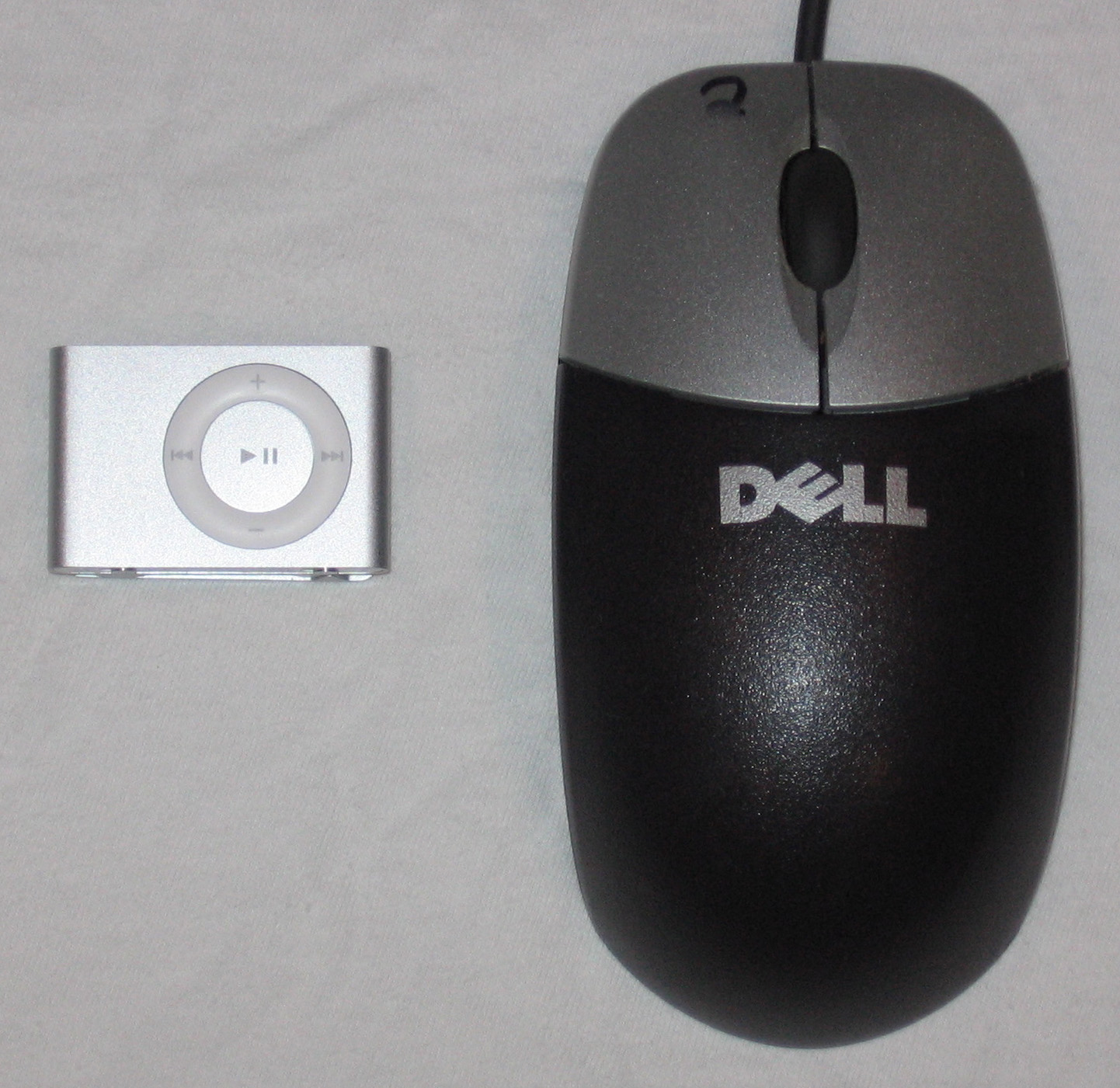
A second-generation iPod Shuffle in size-comparison to a Dell mouse

On September 12, 2006, Apple announced the release of the second-generation iPod Shuffle, claiming it to be "world's smallest digital music player" and "the most wearable iPod ever". First shipments of the unit were slated for an October 2006 arrival, but actually started shipping on Friday, November 3, 2006.

The second generation initially featured a 1 GB model in a silver brushed aluminum case, similar to the second-generation iPod Nano and the older iPod Mini and the same shape as the contemporary iPod Radio Remote, which introduced to the iPod Shuffle line a built-in belt clip. The new model is less than half the size of the first-generation model at 41.2 x 27.3 x 10.5 mm (1.62 x 1.07 x 0.41 in) and weighs only 15.5 grams (0.55 oz). The power/shuffle/sequential switch from the first-generation version was separated into two controls to avoid an accidentally selected mode of operation.

On the second-generation iPod Shuffle and later, USB connectivity for the transfer of music and data and the recharging of the iPod's internal battery is provided as a non-standard alternate mode of its headphone jack; Apple supplied as a standard accessory for this generation a miniature docking station with a permanently attached USB-A cable. Third-party accessories were released providing connectivity in alternative form factors such as plain cables and solid adapters, including a limited implementation of larger iPods' 30-pin dock connector.

The second-generation Shuffle plays MP3, AAC, Audible (formats 2, 3 and 4), PCM WAV and AIFF files: the only iTunes-supported file format that the iPod does not support is Apple Lossless.

On January 30, 2007, Apple announced the addition of four new colors to the iPod Shuffle line - pink, orange, green, and blue, in addition to the original silver color. The orange color was a first for the iPod franchise. They also now came with new redesigned earphones that were not included with the original silver model. The box was also changed to have gray text instead of the lime-green text. On September 5, 2007, Apple introduced four new colors, including a Product Red version. The new colors were turquoise, lavender, mint green, and Product Red, with the previous colors discontinued. On February 19, 2008, Apple introduced a 2 GB version of the iPod Shuffle, retailing for US$69 and available in all the same colours as the 1 GB model. At the Apple Let's Rock Event on September 9, 2008, Apple once again released four new colors for the iPod Shuffle: blue, green, pink, and red, replacing the colors that were released in September 2007. The new blue, green and pink variants of the iPod Shuffle reverted to shades that were similar to the colors that were released in January 2007. In June 2009, Avon offered a gold iPod Shuffle (second generation) for $29 when purchased in conjunction with two ANEW skin care products.

The second generation 2 GB iPod Shuffle was discontinued on March 11, 2009, and the 1 GB version was discontinued on September 9, 2009.

=== 3rd generation ===
A third-generation iPod Shuffle

The third-generation iPod Shuffle was released on March 11, 2009; it was said by Apple to be "jaw-droppingly small" and "The first music player that talks to you". with dimensions of 45.2 mm × 17.5 mm × 7.8 mm (1.8 in × 0.7 in × 0.3 in). It was available with a silver or black brushed aluminum case similar to the second generation iPod Shuffle; this made it the first iPod Shuffle that was available in black. It featured VoiceOver technology that allowed song names, artist names, album names and playlist contents and names to be spoken in 20 different languages using the Text-to-Speech incorporated in iTunes 8 and 9, which is based on Nuance Vocalizer. Users of MacOS 10.5 and newer will hear the Text-to-Speech voice Alex on their iPod shuffle, while MacOS 10.4 and Windows users will hear the Text-to-Speech voice Samantha. It has also gained support for multiple playlists, in contrast to previous versions of the iPod Shuffle, which only allowed a single playlist.

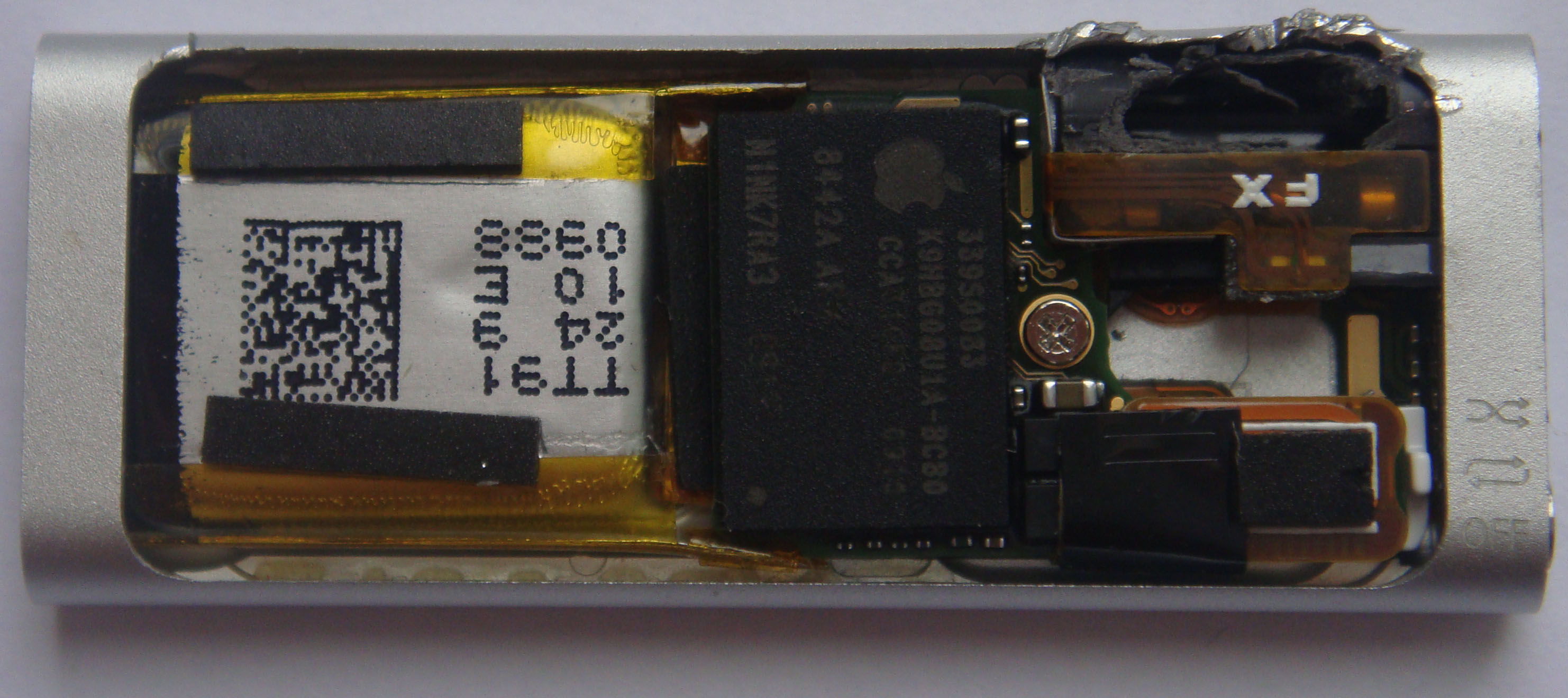
The inside of a third-generation iPod Shuffle

The third-generation iPod Shuffle featured a polished steel attachment clip, adopting for the first time the polished steel finishing previously found only on the larger iPods, rather than the brushed aluminum used in the second-generation iPod Shuffle. It also no longer had volume or track controls on the device itself. Instead, the packaged iPod earbuds included a three-button device on the right earbud cord. This added the functions of changing between playlists, hearing the song title and artist of the track playing, as well as play/pause, track changes and volume control. It was originally not possible to change songs or volume with most third-party headphones, since they lacked these controls. However, since the device began playing music automatically when it was turned on, third-party headphones could still be used in "autoplay" mode (with no volume or playback controls), and after its release, some third-party headphones and headphone adapters began to include full support for the third generation. The official headphones contained a chip designed by Apple to control the device. DRM is not however present in the chip as there is no encryption used.

According to the compatibility list published in Apple's website, none of the currently sold Apple headphones support the third-generation iPod shuffle.

On September 9, 2009, Apple introduced three new colors for the iPod Shuffle: pink, blue, and green. The Apple Store also offered a 4 GB model made of polished stainless steel.

=== 4th generation ===
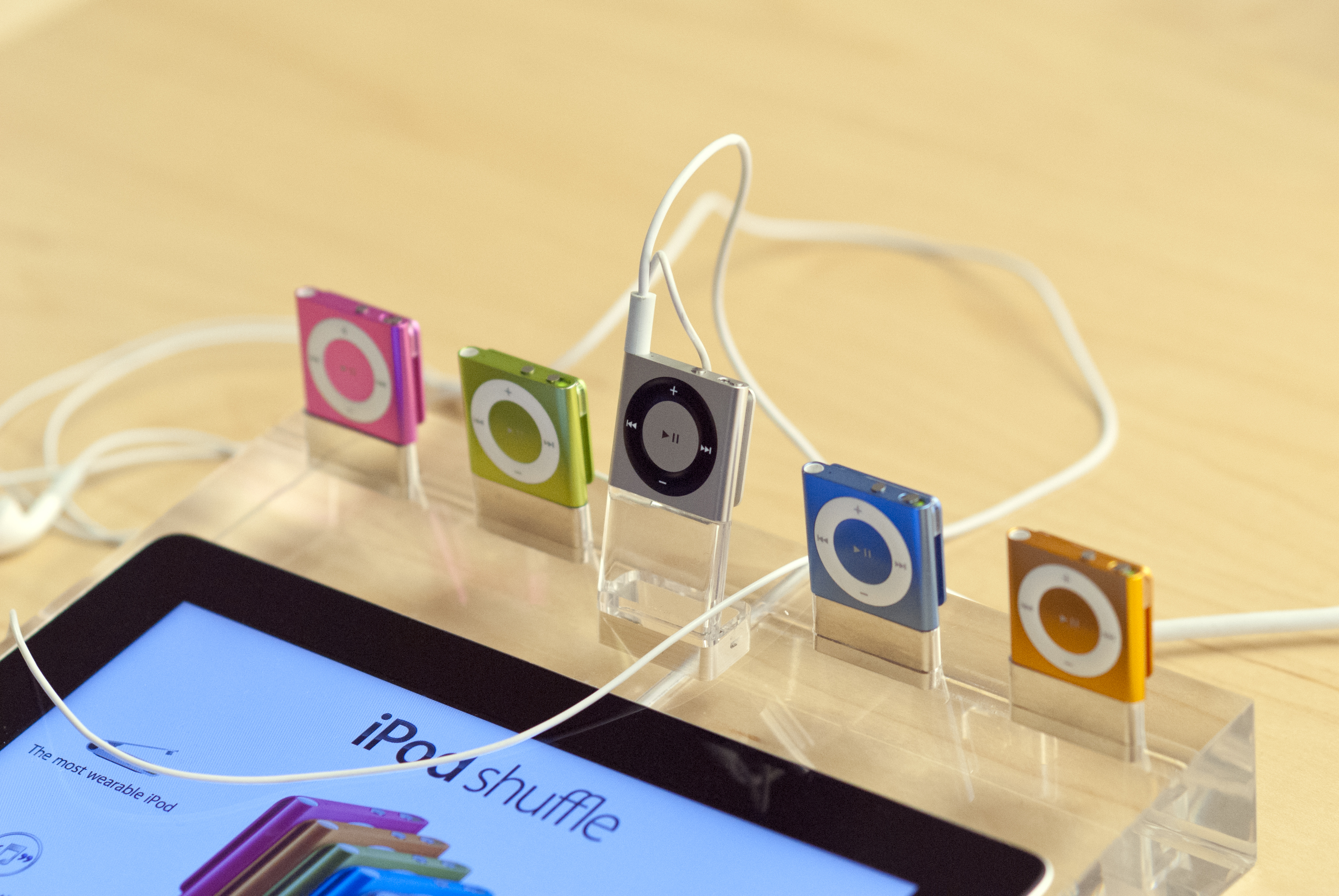
Various iPod Shuffles (4th generation) on display at an Apple Store

On August 27, 2010, Apple won a patent for a "Very small form factor consumer electronic product", which describes the parts and processes that go into making the ultra-portable music player, the iPod shuffle.

On September 1, 2010, the fourth and final generation was released as part of the new iPod lineup. The fourth generation features the return of clickable track and volume controls from the first two generations. The control pad is 18% larger than the second generation of iPod Shuffle, and the dimensions of the device are 29 mm × 31.6 mm × 8.7 mm (1.1 in × 1.2 in × 0.3 in) and it weighs 12.5 g (0.4 oz).

The model also features VoiceOver from the third generation, now with a devoted physical button, in twenty-nine languages (Chinese, Czech, Danish, Dutch, English, Finnish, French, German, Greek, Hungarian, Italian, Japanese, Korean, Norwegian, Polish, Portuguese, Romanian, Russian, Slovak, Spanish, Swedish, Thai, and Turkish). It also features Genius, and can handle multiple playlists. Like the previous generation it supports MP3, VBR, AAC, Protected AAC, Audible (formats 2, 3 and 4), WAV, AIFF and Apple Lossless, and its battery lasts for 15 hours of music, according to Apple.

It was originally sold in five colors (silver with a black control pad, green, blue, orange and pink with a white control pad). However, on September 12, 2012, Apple held an event to formally introduce the iPhone 5, as well as a new iPod lineup, and the iPod Shuffle remained unchanged except for seven new color options (silver or black with a black control pad or green, blue, pink, yellow, and purple with a white control pad), as well as a Product Red edition model with a white control pad. Unlike the second generation, the iPod does not come with a dock, but like the third generation, comes with a 45 mm USB Cable. The included in-box headphones do not feature the remote control, but the device supports them.

On September 10, 2013, to coincide with the release of the iPhone 5S, the "Slate" color option was replaced with "Space Grey".

On July 15, 2015, Apple released 6 new colors (blue, pink, silver, gold, space grey, and Product (Red) for the iPod Shuffle.

On July 27, 2017, the iPod Shuffle, along with the iPod Nano, was discontinued.

== Models ==
Generation	Image	Capacity	Colors	Connection	Original release date	Minimum OS to sync	Rated battery life (hours)
1st	first-generation iPod Shuffle	512 MB	White	USB 2.0 (no adapter required)	January 12, 2005	Mac: 10.2.8; Windows: 2000	audio: 12
1st	first-generation iPod Shuffle	1 GB	White	USB 2.0 (no adapter required)	January 12, 2005	Mac: 10.2.8; Windows: 2000	audio: 12
1st	first-generation iPod Shuffle	New entry-level model. Uses flash memory and has no screen. It was discontinued on September 12, 2006.					
2nd	second-generation iPod Shuffle	1 GB	Silver	USB 2.0 (with included dock)	September 12, 2006	Mac: 10.3.9; Windows: 2000	audio: 12
2nd	second-generation iPod Shuffle	1 GB	Silver; Blue; Green; Orange; Pink	USB 2.0 (with included dock)	January 30, 2007	Mac: 10.3.9; Windows: 2000	audio: 12
2nd	second-generation iPod Shuffle	1 GB	Silver Gold; Light Blue; Light Green; Purple; Product Red special edition	USB 2.0 (with included dock)	September 5, 2007	Mac: 10.4.8; Windows: 2000	audio: 12
2nd	second-generation iPod Shuffle	2 GB	Silver Gold; Light Blue; Light Green; Purple; Product Red special edition	USB 2.0 (with included dock)	February 19, 2008	Mac: 10.4.8; Windows: 2000	audio: 12
2nd	second-generation iPod Shuffle	1 GB	Silver; Blue; Green; Pink; Product Red special edition	USB 2.0 (with included dock)	September 9, 2008	Mac: 10.4.10; Windows: 2000	audio: 12
2nd	second-generation iPod Shuffle	2 GB	Silver; Blue; Green; Pink; Product Red special edition	USB 2.0 (with included dock)	September 9, 2008	Mac: 10.4.10; Windows: 2000	audio: 12
2nd	second-generation iPod Shuffle	Smaller clip design with anodized aluminum casing. The 1st model was discontinued on January 30, 2007. The 2nd model was discontinued on September 5, 2007. The 3rd model was discontinued on February 18, 2008. The 4th model reached the end of its production on March 11, 2009.					
3rd		4 GB	Silver; Black	USB 2.0 (cable is included)	March 11, 2009	Mac: 10.4.11; Windows: XP	audio: 10
3rd		2 GB	Silver; Black; Blue; Green; Pink	USB 2.0 (cable is included)	September 9, 2009	Mac: 10.4.11; Windows: XP	audio: 10
3rd		4 GB	Silver; Black; Blue; Green; Pink; Polished Stainless Steel (exclusive to Apple Online and retail stores)	USB 2.0 (cable is included)	September 9, 2009	Mac: 10.4.11; Windows: XP	audio: 10
3rd		Smaller design with controls relocated to right earbud cable, features playlists and VoiceOver. The 4 GB model was discontinued on September 9, 2009. The 2 GB model was discontinued on September 1, 2010.					
4th		2 GB	Silver; Blue; Green; Orange; Pink	USB 2.0 (cable is included)	September 1, 2010	Mac: 10.5.8; Windows: XP	audio: 15
4th		2 GB	Silver; Black; Blue; Green; Pink; Purple; Yellow; Product Red Special edition	USB 2.0 (cable is included)	September 12, 2012	Mac: 10.6.8; Windows: XP (SP3)	audio: 15
4th		2 GB	Silver; Blue; Gold; Pink; Space Gray; Product Red Special Edition	USB 2.0 (cable is included)	July 15, 2015	Mac: 10.7.5; Windows: 7	audio: 15
4th		Redesign returning the play/track/volume buttons from the second generation and power/shuffle mode switch from the 1st gen, and adding a button for VoiceOver. The silver, blue, green, orange and pink models were discontinued on September 12, 2012. Apple replaced them with new silver, slate, purple, pink, yellow, green and blue models, all with matte finish, rather than a glossy finish, in order to correspond with the 5th-generation iPod touch and 7th-generation iPod nano. New "Space Gray" color option replaces "Slate" as of September 10, 2013, in order to correspond with the iPhone 5S. Discontinued on July 27, 2017.					

== Reception and impact ==
The iPod Shuffle was announced at the same time as the Mac Mini. Like the iPod Shuffle, the Mac Mini is a scaled-down product which was introduced at a lower price. These two products together can be seen as a conscious effort on the part of Apple management to target a lower-end market and increase visibility in the mass-market. Previously, the success of Apple's iPod and especially the iPod Mini had been chipping away at the inexpensive flash player market, causing flash players at the beginning of 2005 to account for less than half the market share they did in 2004. However, the original and Mini iPods were expensive and the Shuffle was intended to make the iPod compete with mainstream players.

By April 2005, the end of Apple's second fiscal quarter, the iPod Shuffle had already proven itself to be a successful product for its manufacturer. Although Apple has chosen not to specify how many iPod Shuffles were sold in the product's first three months of existence, analysts at Piper Jaffray estimated that 1.8 million of the 5.3 million iPods sold in the second quarter were Shuffles. NPD Group estimates that the iPod Shuffle captured 43% of the flash-based music player market in February 2005, after only its second month of existence; by March 2005, its market share had risen to 58%. The iPod Shuffle effectively helped Apple to replace iriver as the global leader in the flash player market, just as it already had been before in the hard disk market. The iPod Shuffle had some market challengers such as Sony's Walkman Bean early on and in later years SanDisk's Sansa Clip, though the iPod Shuffle generally sold better.

In September 2006, Apple CEO Steve Jobs announced during his keynote presentation on the "It's Showtime" Special Event, that until then, Apple had sold 10 million first-generation iPod Shuffles.

=== Problems ===
==== Blinking light problem ====
PC World reported a problem with the first-generation iPod Shuffles ceasing normal function, only to flash orange and green lights and become unmountable. Since the Shuffle has no display, the owner cannot read an error message or troubleshoot easily, requiring diagnosis by Apple service personnel. Flashing green and orange lights on the iPod Shuffle indicate that a generic "error" has occurred, according to Apple's documentation. If the device is still covered by warranty, Apple will replace it for free. This problem has also occurred on second-generation iPod Shuffles.

On October 26, 2006, Apple released an iPod Shuffle Reset Utility that corrected this problem for some owners of first-generation iPod Shuffles. Then, in March 2007, an updated iPod Reset Utility was released which can also address similar problems with second-generation iPod Shuffles.

==== Third-generation headphone controls ====
Unlike most other portable audio players, the third-generation iPod Shuffle's controls are situated on the packaged headphones. The user is unable to control the device unless they use either Apple headphones designed for it, or third-party headphones or adapters. The third generation iPod Shuffle's headphones contain a proprietary integrated circuit. Also, inline control adapters that were made by third-party companies for use with the iPhone are incompatible with the iPod Shuffle.

Several months after the third-generation release, several third-party companies, including Belkin and Scosche, released adapters which can be used to add the controls to standard headphones.

Timeline of compact iPod models
Sources: Apple press release library, Mactracker Apple Inc. model database
