= Underwater Audio =

American electronics company

Underwater Audio is an electronics company that invents, manufactures, and distributes waterproof gadgets such as headphones, earphones, iPod Shuffles, and waterproof smart devices for swimmers.

Brigham Young University marketing graduate Scott Walker established the company as a junior in college in 2011.

The company's operations are based entirely online.

== Products & Technology ==
According to the company's website, Underwater audio's devices are tested to withstand indefinite submersion in up to 10 feet of water. Underwater Audio gained its original traction in the waterproof electronics space by developing a proprietary method for waterproofing iPod Shuffles. Since the discontinuation of the Shuffle in 2017, Underwater Audio has forged a path forward by releasing an original line of waterproof MP3 players and waterproof Micro Tablets. These devices include the SYRYN, an 8GB compact MP3 Player which offers many of the same features as the once-popular iPod Shuffle, and their Flagship device known as The Delphin, a micro tablet which comes in 8 and 16gb storage options. The Delphin is designed to be used with popular streaming apps such as Spotify, Audible, Pandora, and other apps available from the Amazon Appstore

Although the Underwater Audio once specialized in waterproof iPod Shuffles, the company is not affiliated with Apple.

== Customer Base ==
Underwater Audio sells its products to consumers in the United States, Canada, and Australia. Expansion plans include Europe, Asia, and the Middle East.

The company's core customers include surfers, divers, beachgoers, and water-based athletes.

According to the Underwater Audio's founder, the majority of customers include older, middle-aged people who swim once a day.

== Consumer and Media Response ==
In April 2013, Underwater Audio was named the top student-run business by the Utah Student 25, which recognizes student entrepreneurs on the basis of revenue and profit.

As of 2013, Underwater Audio has the number 2 marketshare in the industry.
