= Apple Polishing Cloth =

Microfiber cleaning cloth by Apple Inc.

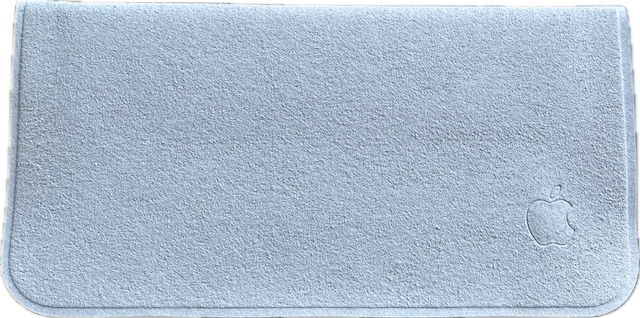
The Apple Polishing Cloth

The Polishing Cloth is a small piece of off-white microfiber cloth sold by Apple Inc. since October 2021 as a screen-cleaning aid for its devices with displays. It is intended as a replacement for the cloth included with the Pro Display XDR, and can be used to clean products that have a "nano-texture glass" matte-like display option, such as the Apple Studio Display, iMacs, iPads, and MacBooks.

The cloth gained media attention due to its high $19 retail price. The New York Times described its pricing as "bold even by Apple’s standards, a company whose legions of loyal customers are conditioned to stomach steep prices." Nonetheless, it was Apple's most back-ordered product in October 2021, with delivery times of several months. The cloth and its popularity were soon the subject of numerous jokes in the media and on social media. Gizmodo criticized media outlets for excessive reporting on the cloth, saying it was essentially free advertising.

The tech website iFixit disassembled the cloth as part of a tongue-in-cheek product teardown, describing it as being composed of two layers and having "a distinct synthetic leather feel (...) with a hint of fuzziness, similar to Alcantara." The cloth also has the Apple logo embossed in the bottom-right corner.

In August 2026, Apple released an updated version of the Polishing Cloth that cost $9, replacing the older $19 version.

== See also ==
- iPod Socks – Protective knitted case for iPod devices
