= SendStation Systems =

German computer accessories manufacturer

- The SendStation logo (2007)
- Company type: Private
- Industry: Computer hardware
- Founded: 1997
- Founder: André Klein
- Headquarters: Frankfurt/Main, Germany
- Key people: André Klein, President and Head of Development
- Products: Computer hardware
- Revenue: unknown
- Number of employees: unknown
- Website: www.sendstation.com

SendStation Systems was a manufacturer of computer and iPod accessories. The company was founded in 1997 in Frankfurt/Main, Germany by current President André Klein.

The name "SendStation" has its roots in a Macintosh-based turn-key video fax system the company created and sold between 1997 and 2000, and is a word play made up from to send, station and sensation. Back then (several years before public broadband internet access became available and affordable) the SendStation was the first system of its kind which allowed filmmakers, advertising agencies and industry clients to easily transfer full-screen-full-motion review copies of TV commercials within minutes around the globe, rather than using overnight couriers. Customers included companies like Audi, Wrigley and BBDO.

== PocketDock ==
In 2003 SendStation entered the hardware market, and became one of the initial five, officially authorized accessory manufacturers for the Apple iPod (which later became known as „Made for iPod“ certified). Its first hardware product, the PocketDock FireWire adapter, allowed iPod owners to connect the device via the then freshly introduced 30-pin iPod dock connector to a standard 6-pin FireWire cable for sync & charge. It was one of the best-selling add-ons on the young market for iPod accessories.

As USB 2.0 became standard and iPods with video capabilities emerged, additional models followed. In order of release (most recent on top):

- PocketDock Line Out Mini USB
- PocketDock AV (USB, Audio Line Out, Composite & S-Video)
- PocketDock Line Out USB
- PocketDock Combo (USB+FW)
- PocketDock Line Out FW
- PocketDock FW

Other products include iPod car chargers, iPod dock extenders, earbud cases and multiple types of adapters for Mac & PC.
