= ISheep =

Derogatory marketing term

iSheep is a marketing description, originally used by SanDisk in 2006, to describe users of the iPod music player instead of SanDisk's own Sansa player.

The iSheep mascot, listening to an iPod. This was created as part of a marketing campaign by rival SanDisk.

The marketing term is borrowed by some in technology sites and Internet forums as an insult to a person or a group of people who are fans of all Apple products, especially those who tend to purchase products from the brand not regarding its actual value or functionality, but the brand name, logo and the status symbol associated with it.

== History ==
=== Origins ===
The term was introduced in May 2006 when SanDisk launched the "iDon’t" campaign to advertise the SanDisk Sansa. iDon't calls on "free thinkers" to "break-free from restrictive formats and a single source for music," with slogans such as "You do not need to follow." The Campaign's site offered T-shirts, posters, and stickers featuring a monkey and asking, "Are you an iChimp?" Another image showed a sheep and says, "iSheep say Baah." while another showed a donkey trying to bite a carrot dangling in front of its face with the slogan "iFollow."

The iSheep campaign was abandoned in July 2006, to give way to the "Lil'Monsta" mascot campaign.

== Meaning and use ==
A common behavior of "Sheep" is labeling new features and capabilities of products of competitors (e.g. Galaxy S4 in 2013) as superfluous or feature creep and flooding online forums with their criticism, while labelling similar features on Apple devices as innovative.

In addition, Air View on the Galaxy S4 (released early 2013) was often mentioned in essay articles that labelled it as feature creep.
