= IPod Socks =

Protective knitted case for iPod devices

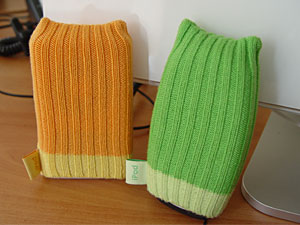
iPod Socks in orange and green

iPod Socks are a set of multi-colored cotton knit socks introduced by Apple Inc. in November 2004 for protection of iPods from damage during travel.

== History ==
On October 26, 2004, Apple CEO Steve Jobs jokingly presented the socks as a "revolutionary new product" at a special music event. They were available in a package of six different colors, including green, purple, grey, blue, orange, and pink, for US$29 (equivalent to $49 in 2025), or about US$5 a sock (equivalent to $9 in 2025).

Eight years later, sometime in September 2012, Apple stopped selling the product. The set soon became a collector's item, with aftermarket prices rising as high as US$90 by 2014 (equivalent to $122 in 2025).

== Reception ==
Jeremy Horwitz of iLounge gave a rating of B− for the socks, indicating a "Limited Recommendation". Horwitz noted the product's two-toned design and ability to hold an iPod of any size, but criticized the socks for inhibiting access to the screen and controls and high price. In 2021, Chaim Gartenberg of The Verge described the product as a "bizarre piece of Apple's history" comparable to the Polishing Cloth, noting that the socks remained relatively popular during its availability from 2004 to 2012 due to their "relatively universal size" and bright colors.

== Legacy ==
In November 2025, Apple announced the iPhone Pocket, a similar product intended for the iPhone. Instead of a sock shape, the iPhone Pocket resembles a knitted bag, designed to be worn around the arm or tied to a purse. Like the iPod Socks, the iPhone Pocket comes in assorted colors and has a knitted appearance. The introductory price was US$150 for a short strap version and US$230 for a long strap. The short strap version was available in yellow ("lemon"), orange ("mandarin"), purple, pink, teal ("peacock"), blue ("sapphire"), brown ("cinnamon"), and black; the long version was only available in sapphire, cinnamon, and black.
