= Mactracker =

- Developer: Ian Page (software developer)
- Release: 14 May 2001
- Stable release: macOS (11.0+): 8.2.3 (May 31, 2026; 3 months ago) [±] iOS (15.0+): 5.0.1 (May 31, 2026; 3 months ago) [±] iPadOS (15.0+): 5.0.1 (May 31, 2026; 3 months ago) [±]
- Operating system: macOS, iOS, iPadOS
- Type: Apple product database
- License: freeware
- Website: https://mactracker.ca/

Mactracker is a freeware application containing a complete database of all Apple hardware models and operating system versions, created and actively developed by Ian Page. Despite the name, it includes details on not just Mac computers, but also other products produced by Apple.

As such, the database includes (but is not limited to) references for the Apple II, Lisa (under its later name, Macintosh XL), Classic Macintosh models (1984–1997; those which run the Classic Mac OS), Modern Mac models (those running Mac OS X and later), printers, scanners, displays, AirPort networking equipment, QuickTake digital cameras, iSight cameras, Apple Newton, iPod, iPhone, iPad, Apple Watch, Apple Vision Pro, AirPods, HomePod, and several other accessories – along with all versions of the Classic Mac OS, macOS, iOS, iPadOS, tvOS, watchOS, and visionOS operating systems. For each model of desktop and portable computer, audio clips of the corresponding startup chime or chime of death are also included.

Sources for the history and text used in Mactracker are credited to Lukas Foljanty, Glen. D Sanford, and English Wikipedia. WidgetWidget and The Iconfactory provided many icons of the hardware. Versions are available for macOS and iOS (both iPhone and iPad run the same universal application which adapts to the device). Versions for Windows and the clickwheel iPod have been discontinued.

== Reviews ==
- Macworld: 5 mice
- MacUpdate: 5 stars (user reviews)
- VersionTracker: 5 stars (user reviews)
