= IPod Mini =

Digital audio player by Apple Computer

iPod mini

- iPod Mini in Silver
- Manufacturer: Apple Computer
- Product family: iPod
- Type: Digital audio player
- Lifespan: February 20, 2004 – September 7, 2005 (1 year, 6 months)
- Media: Microdrive hard drive (either 4 or 6 GB)
- Operating system: 1.4.1
- Display: 1.67" monochrome LCD at 138 x 110 pixels
- Input: Click wheel
- Connectivity: USB 2.0; FireWire; Dock connector Remote connector
- Power: Lithium-ion battery
- Model Number: A1051
- Successor: iPod Nano

The iPod Mini (stylized and marketed as the iPod mini) is a digital audio player that was designed and marketed by Apple Computer. It was positioned as a smaller, midrange model in Apple's iPod product line to complement the iPod Classic. The device was announced on January 6, 2004, and released on February 20 of the same year. A second generation version with enhanced battery life and increased storage was released on February 23, 2005. While it was in production, it was one of the most popular electronic products on the market, with consumers often unable to find a retailer with the product in stock.

The iPod Mini was the first iPod device to use the click wheel, which was developed for Apple by Synaptics. It combined the touch-sensitive scroll wheel of the third generation iPod with buttons located beneath the wheel. This interface proved to be popular and was adopted for several later iPod models. Above the wheel is a monochrome 1.67" LCD that displays a menu or information about the selected track. The iPod Mini was discontinued on September 7, 2005, when it was succeeded by the iPod Nano.

== Models ==
Model	Image	Capacity	Colors	Connection	Original release date	Minimum OS to sync	Rated battery life (hours)
1st generation	iPod Mini (1st Generation) Model A1051: January 2004	4 GB	colors — 5: Silver; Blue; Green; Pink; Gold	USB or FireWire	February 20, 2004	Mac: 10.1.5 or later Windows: 2000 iTunes 4.6 or later	audio: 8
1st generation	New smaller model, available in 5 colors. Introduced the "Click Wheel".						
2nd generation	iPod Mini (2nd generation) Model A1051	4 GB	Silver; Blue; Green; Pink	USB or FireWire	February 23, 2005	Mac: 10.2.8 or 10.3.4 or later Windows: 2000 iTunes 4.7 or later	audio: 18
2nd generation	iPod Mini (2nd generation) Model A1051	6 GB	Silver; Blue; Green; Pink	USB or FireWire	February 23, 2005	Mac: 10.2.8 or 10.3.4 or later Windows: 2000 iTunes 4.7 or later	audio: 18
2nd generation	Brighter color variants with longer battery life. Click Wheel lettering matched body color. Gold color discontinued. The second generation iPod Mini was the final monochrome iPod to be sold by Apple, with the larger iPod (fourth generation) replaced with color screen models in early 2005.						

== Details ==
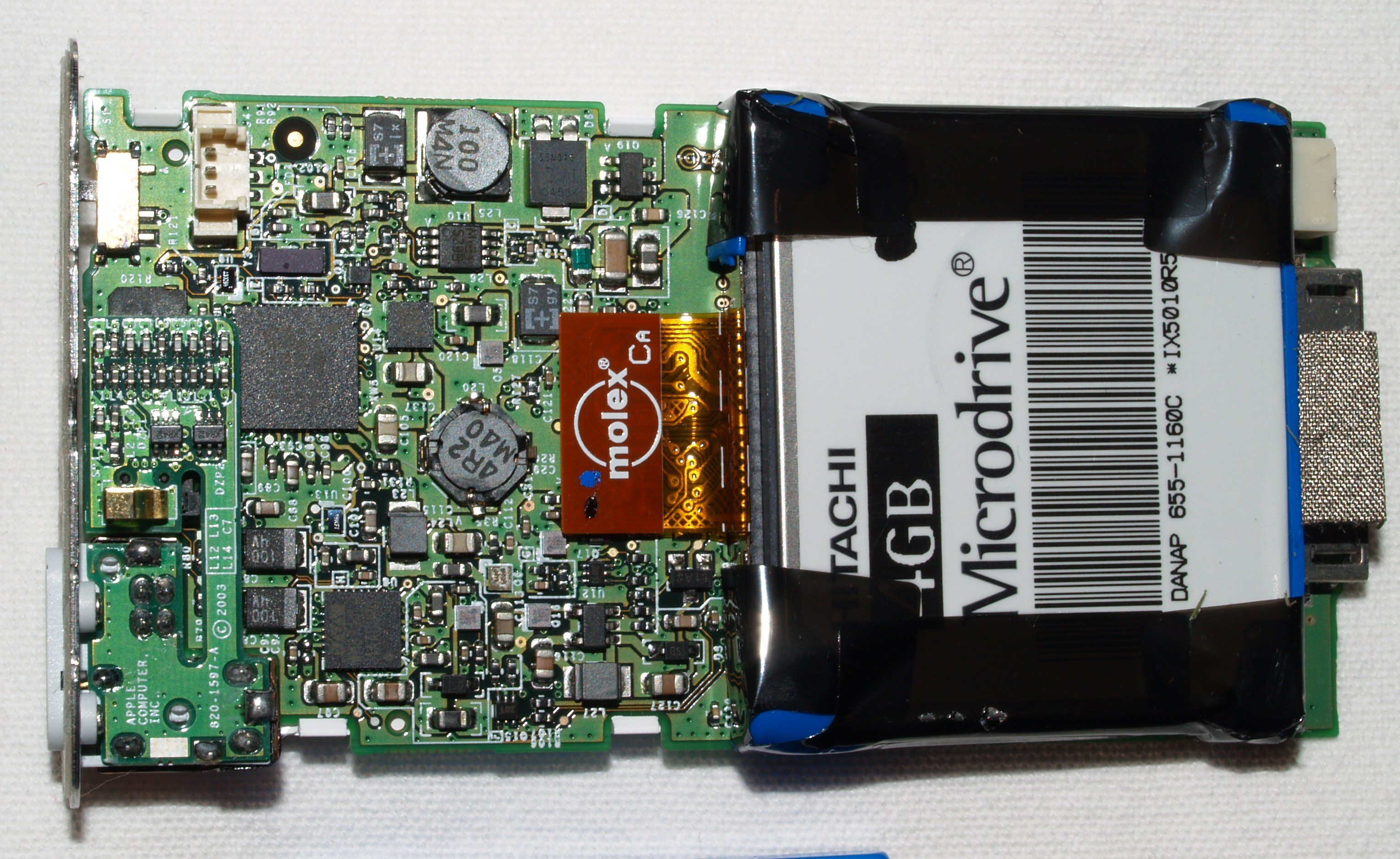
The iPod Mini's Microdrive (4 GB Hitachi model), seen here on the right

The two generations of iPod Mini are almost identical apart from minor cosmetic differences. The first generation model has gray control symbols on the click wheel, while those on the second generation match the color of the body. Their major functional differences lay in their storage capacity and battery life. Both versions measure 3.6x2.0x0.5 inches (91x51x13 mm) and weigh 3.6 ounces (102 grams). The case is made from anodized aluminium. First generation iPod Minis were available in five colors: silver, gold, pink, blue, and green. The gold model was dropped from the second generation range. The pink, blue, and green models received brighter hues in the second generation but the silver model remained unchanged.

The iPod Mini uses Microdrive hard drives (CompactFlash II) made by Hitachi and Seagate. First generation models were available in a 4 GB size, while second generation models were available in both 4 GB and 6 GB versions (quoted as capable of storing roughly 1,000 and 1,500 songs, respectively). Second generation models have their capacity laser etched into the aluminum case.

The battery life for the first generation iPod Mini was criticized for its 8-hour duration, similar to the third generation iPod that was available at the time. Apple addressed this problem in the second generation models by increasing the battery life to about 18 hours, at the cost of removing the included FireWire and AC adapter cables to avoid increasing selling costs. A proprietary Apple 30-pin dock connector is located on the bottom of the device. The iPod Mini can charge and transfer files when connected to a computer via USB or FireWire. Along the top, it has a hold switch, a headphone jack, and a remote connector for accessories.

The iPod Mini supports MP3, AAC/M4A, WAV, AIFF, and Apple Lossless audio formats. It supports integration with iTunes and the iTunes Store, allowing for syncing of content between the software application and the iPod Mini.

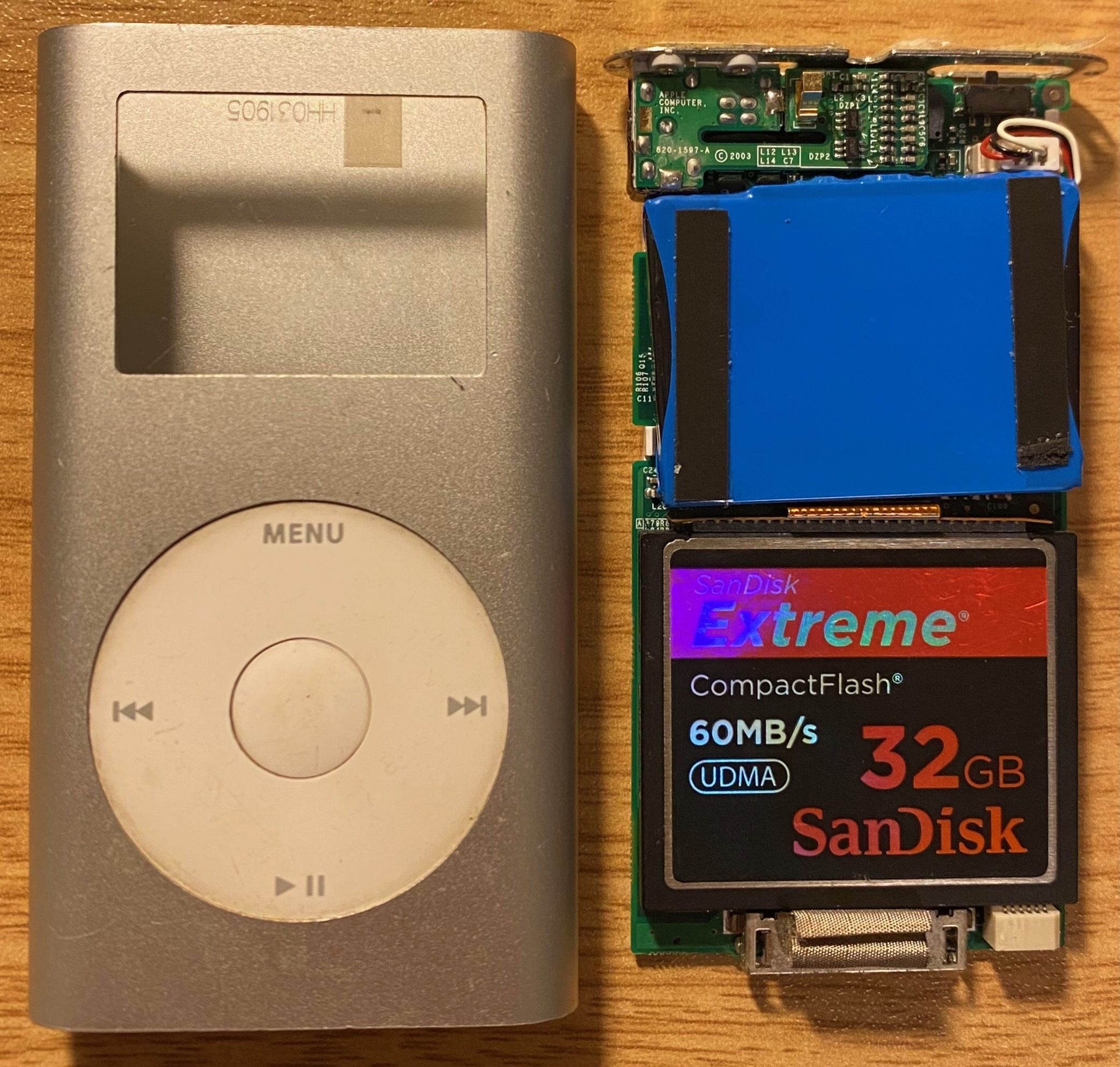
A second generation iPod Mini with a Compact Flash card in place of its original Hitachi Microdrive

Timeline of compact iPod models
Sources: Apple press release library, Mactracker Apple Inc. model database
