= Samsung i300 =

Mobile phone model

Samsung SGH-i300
- Manufacturer: Samsung Electronics
- Availability by region: 2005
- Compatible networks: GSM 900/1800/1900, GPRS
- Form factor: bar
- Operating system: Windows Mobile 2003
- Memory: 3 GB
- Display: 2.0" TFT LCD
- Connectivity: IrDA, Bluetooth

The Samsung SGH-i300 is a discontinued smartphone developed by Samsung Electronics. Announced at CEBiT in March 2005, it was the world's first smartphone with an embedded hard disk, and was also Samsung's first Windows Mobile smartphone to be launched in the European Union. The code name of this smartphone project was Thor, which continued a trend in their series of smartphones with mythology-themed codenames such as Odin and Muse.

== Specifications ==
- Windows Mobile 2003 (Smartphone)
- GSM tri-band (900/1800/1900)/GPRS class 10
- 3GB HDD embedded (i300X : 4GB HDD)
- Region: Europe, South East Asia
- 2.0" LCD
- Dual Speakers
- IrDA/Bluetooth
