= Click wheel =

Navigation component of several iPod models

The iPod line's signature click wheel

The click wheel is a navigation component of non–touch-screen iPod models. It uses a combination of touch technology and traditional buttons, involving the technology of capacitive sensing, which senses the touch of the user's fingers. The wheel allows a user to find music, videos, photos and play games on the device. The wheel is flush on the face of the iPod and is located below the screen. The click wheel was invented by Norihiko Saito in 1998.

The design was first released with the iPod mini, and was last used with the iPod nano (5th Generation). The click wheel's design is credited to Apple's former senior vice president of worldwide marketing, Phil Schiller.

== Details ==
The click wheel detects a user's input via its touch sensitive ring. Because of four mechanical buttons that lie beneath it, the ring is able to perform multiple commands. For example, browsing through music, after selecting a particular song, the click-wheel is used to adjust the volume. Pressing the select button can be used to skip to a specific part in the song.

The primary technology that the click-wheel demonstrates is that of capacitive sensing. This technology actually dates back to 1919, where it was first utilized in a musical instrument called a theremin. It allowed the pitch and volume of the instrument to be controlled by the distance from the musician's hands to two antennae. When a voltage is placed upon two conductors in close proximity with one another, without coming into contact, energy is stored in the form of electric fields. Even after the voltage is taken away, the stored charge remains. This is how a capacitor gathers and stores energy. The click wheel uses this property to detect the location of a finger, since the human body has capacitance with the conductive membrane under the click wheel’s plastic covering.

The click wheel replaced the touch wheel starting with the fourth-generation iPod, and was present on the first through fifth generations of the iPod Nano.

The "brain" behind the click-wheel is the conductive membrane behind the plastic covering. This membrane has "channels" that when connected, create a set of coordinates. These channels are conductors, which when connected to another conductor (a finger in this case), try to send a current through the user's finger, but are blocked by the plastic covering the click-wheel. So instead of passing through the plastic, the current creates a charge at the closest location to the finger, which is also known as capacitance. The component that detects this change in capacitance is the controller. Whenever the controller senses a change, it sends a signal to the microprocessor, which performs the desired action. The faster a finger moves around the wheel, the more concentrated the stream of signals it sends out. The moment the finger leaves the wheel, however, is when the controller stops detecting change in capacitance, therefore stopping the current process.

== Similar technologies ==
The Creative Zen Touch from 2004 has a vertical scroll wheel similar to the iPod's click wheel. That same year, the luxury Nokia 7280 mobile phone also featured a scroll wheel. The Samsung SGH-i300 from 2005, as well as Motorola ROKR E8 from 2007, also have it. In 2007, Nokia created the 'Navi wheel' which debuted on the Nokia N81. LG also implemented such a feature on its LG Chocolate (VX8550). Several models of Sony Walkman music players also have similar interfaces. During the Development of the 2007 iPhone there was going to be a virtual click wheel in the Acorn OS early prototypes but was scrapped in favour of what we know of today.
