= Philips Nino =

Portable computer device

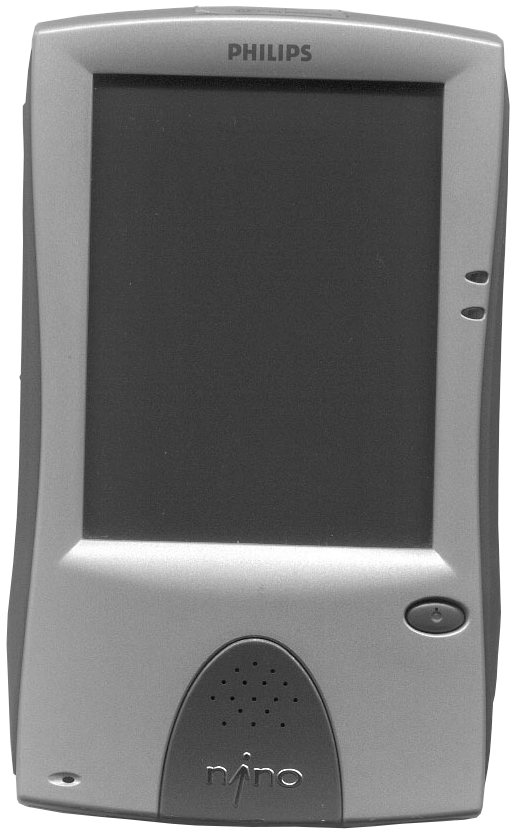
- Developer: Philips
- Type: Palm-size PC
- Released: 1998
- Discontinued: 2001
- Operating system: Windows CE
- CPU: 75 MHz Philips PR31700
- Predecessor: Velo 500
- Website: "www.nino.philips.com" at the Wayback Machine (archived December 12, 1998)

The Philips Nino is a so-called Palm-size PC, a predecessor to the Pocket PC platform. It was a PDA-style device with a stylus-operated touch screen. The Nino 200 and Nino 300 models had a monochrome screen while the Nino 500 had a color display. The Nino featured a Voice Control Software and Tegic T9.

== See also ==
- Philips Velo
