= Philips Velo =

Velo 1
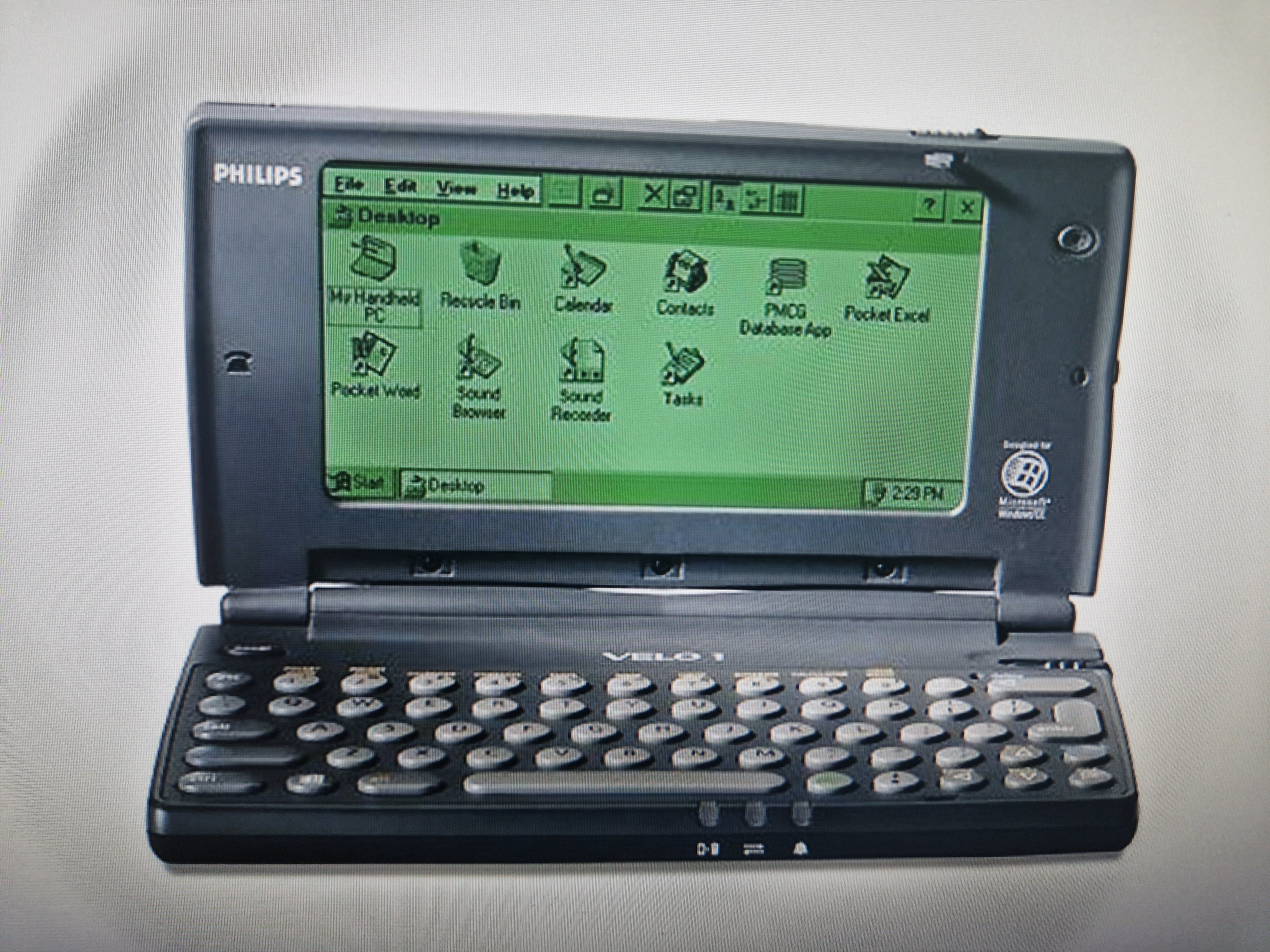
- Developer: Philips
- Manufacturer: Philips
- Type: Handheld PC
- Released: 1997; 29 years ago
- Introductory price: US$599.99 (equivalent to $1,203 in 2025)
- Discontinued: 2000
- Operating system: Windows CE 1.0 (Optional ROM upgrade to Windows CE 2.0)
- CPU: 36.86 MHz Philips MP3910 (32 bit)
- Memory: RAM 4 MiB; ROM 8 MiB
- Display: Green back-lit 5.1-inch resistive touchscreen
- Graphics: 480×240, 2 bits per pixel, 4 grey shades
- Input: Built-in QWERTY-type keyboard
- Power: 2 x AA batteries or a rechargeable NiMH battery pack.
- Dimensions: 172 x 95 x 32 millimetres
- Weight: 374 grams (battery included)
- Successor: Velo 500
- Website: "www.velo1.com" at the Wayback Machine (archived January 29, 1997)

The Philips Velo is a Handheld PC developed by Philips.

== Velo 1 ==
The initial Velo 1 was a PDA device released by Philips in 1997. The device was typical of the HPCs at the time, being powered by two AA batteries or a rechargeable NiMH battery pack. It had a back-lit, greyscale, 5.1-inch resistive touchscreen with a resolution of 480×240 pixels. Employing two bits per pixel allowed for the display of four shades of grey (16 shades with Windows CE 2.0 upgrade). Expandability was via two internal Miniature Card expansion slots, as well as a PCMCIA slot provided by an optional V-Module. The Velo Dock, a docking station, also provided a PCMCIA slot.

The standard model included 4 MB of RAM and 8 MB ROM. It originally shipped with Windows CE 1.0, but in September 1997, an 8 MB model with NiMH battery pack was announced at a price of $839.99, and Windows CE 2.0 offered as a free future ROM upgrade for all newly purchased Velo 1 units. Existing customers were able to order this upgrade for $99.99. Users with 4 MB devices were strongly recommended to upgrade to 8 MB, and an upgrade programme was announced to offer 4 MB Miniature Cards at reduced prices for US customers.

Unlike most other HPCs, the Velo 1 included a built-in low-power software modem, where most other devices required a PCMCIA card modem. PCMCIA cards could quickly drain batteries, so the low-power software modem helped eke out battery life. The modem operated at 19.2 kbit/s. Other communication features included an infrared (IrDa) port and serial port, capable of a maximum transmission rate of 115,200 bit/s and 230,000 bit/s respectively.

The MIPS processor in the unit, the PR31500, incorporated a digital signal processing (DSP) unit to allow the processor to take over audio processing and signalling responsibilities, eliminating the need for dedicated DSP circuitry or modem. An accompanying processor, the UCB1100, was provided for telephone line interfacing. The PR31500 also offered improved code density compared to previous MIPS-based products by allowing pipeline stalls to occur and thereby eliminating no-operation instruction usage in certain situations. The choice of processor reportedly made its performance snappy compared to other devices, such as the HP 300LX or HP320LX.

== Velo 500 ==
In July, 1998 the Velo 1 was replaced by the Velo 500, which included more RAM and ROM and a much faster Philips PR31700 MIPS processor running at 75 MHz. The Velo 500 had a widescreen resolution of 620×240 pixels, which was becoming the norm. Not only did the screen feature more horizontal pixels, it now displayed in four bits per pixel, allowing 16 shades of grey to be displayed. It featured up to 24 MiB of RAM as well as an upgrade to the software modem, which operated at 28.8 kbit/s, a digital voice recorder and shipped with Windows CE 2.0.

== See also ==
- Philips Nino
