= IPod game =

Game designed for the iPod platform

An iPod click wheel game (or simply iPod game) is a video game designed for the Apple iPod, a portable media player. The original iPod included the game Brick (originally invented by Apple co-founder Steve Wozniak) as a hidden easter egg; later firmware versions added it as a standard menu option. Subsequent revisions of the iPod added three more games: Parachute, Solitaire, and Music Quiz. Apple eventually offered third-party iPod games for sale through the iTunes Store. These games are distinct from games for the iPod Touch, which require iOS and are distributed exclusively through the App Store.

The third-generation iPod (released in 2003) featured Brick, Music Quiz, Parachute, and Solitaire natively accessible via the "Extras" menu. On the original first-generation iPod, Brick was initially accessible only by navigating to the "About" screen and holding the center button for several seconds.

== History ==
On December 23, 2005, the startup Coolgorilla launched an audio-based trivia game titled Rock and Pop Quiz.

In September 2006, the iTunes Store began to offer nine additional games for purchase alongside the launch of iTunes 7, which were compatible with the fifth-generation iPod running software 1.2 or later. The launch titles included Bejeweled, Cubis 2, Mahjong, Mini Golf, Pac-Man, Tetris, Texas Hold 'Em, Vortex, and Zuma. These games retailed for US$4.99 each. In December 2006, EA Mobile released two more titles at the same price: Royal Solitaire and Sudoku. In February 2007, Ms. Pac-Man was released, followed in April 2007 by iQuiz. Prior to April 2007, all available games could be purchased together in a bundle, though without a discount.

In May 2007, Apple released Lost: The Video Game by Gameloft, based on the television show. In June 2007, Kaplan released SAT Prep 2008 as three separate educational titles focused on writing, reading, and mathematics. In December 2007, Apple released a classic Sega game, Sonic the Hedgehog, originally packaged with the Sega Genesis in the early 1990s.

The involvement of major third-party developers such as Namco, Square Enix, EA, Sega, and Hudson Soft signaled Apple's initial foray into the handheld console market. Major video game publications, including GamePro and EGM, regularly reviewed iPod games.

iPod games were distributed as `.ipg` (iPod game) files, which were functionally renamed `.zip` archives. Extracting them reveals executable code alongside standard audio and image files, which initially sparked interest in third-party homebrew development. However, this largely amounted to superficial visual tweaks, as Apple never publicly released a software development kit (SDK) for click-wheel iPod development. The modern iOS SDK supports only iOS on the iPhone and iPod Touch.

In October 2011, Apple removed all click wheel games from the iTunes Store.

Following their discontinuation—which effectively rendered the games abandonware—efforts to preserve the software gained traction online, particularly on Reddit. In late 2024, the "iPod Clickwheel Games Preservation Project" was established by user Olsro to archive the complete library. Preservation was initially hindered by Apple's FairPlay digital rights management (DRM), which tied each game strictly to the purchaser's iTunes account and hardware. The project reached a milestone in September 2025 when all 54 officially released titles were successfully backed up and made playable via a virtual machine setup that bypassed the server-side DRM checks.

== Games ==
The following is a list of all 54 games released for click-wheel iPods. Prior to their discontinuation in 2011, titles typically cost US$4.99 each, with the exception of Reversi and Chinese Checkers.

The list contains 54 games that are known to exist. The list is always kept up to date by this script.

Title	Publisher	Release date	Game ID
Texas Hold'Em	Apple Inc.	2006-09-12	33333 (v1.1 is 33353)
Zuma	PopCap Games	2006-09-12	44444 (v1.1 is 12102)
Pac-Man	Namco	2006-09-12	AAAAA (v1.1 is 14020)
Tetris	Electronic Arts	2006-09-12	66666 (v1.1/v1.2 is 66686)
Mini Golf	Electronic Arts	2006-09-12	88888 (v1.1 is 88908)
Cubis 2	Fresh Games	2006-09-12	99999 (v1.1 is 13100)
Vortex	Apple Inc.	2006-09-12	12345 (demo is 12346)
Royal Solitaire	Electronic Arts	2006-12	50514
Sudoku	Electronic Arts	2006-12-19	50513 (v1.1/v1.2 is 50533)
Ms. Pac-Man	Namco	2007-02-27	14004 (demo is 14005, v1.1 is 14024)
iQuiz	Apple Inc.	2007-04	11002
Lost	Ubisoft	2007-05	1B200
SAT Prep 2008 (Math)	Kaplan	2007-06-22	11052 (v1.1 is 11072)
SAT Prep 2008 (Reading)	Kaplan	2007-06-22	11050 (v1.1 is 11070)
SAT Prep 2008 (Writing)	Kaplan	2007-06-22	11051 (v1.1 is 11071)
The Sims Bowling	Electronic Arts	2007-07-17	1500C (v1.1 is 15032)
The Sims Pool	Electronic Arts	2007-07-31	1500E (v1.1 is 15035)
Musika (Only Released in UK)	NanaOn-Sha, Ltd./Sony BMG	2007-08-07	1C300
Brain Challenge	Gameloft / Apple Inc.	2007-09-05	21000
Phase	Harmonix	2007-11-06	1D000
Sonic the Hedgehog	Sega	2007-12-18	18000
Peggle	PopCap Games	2007-12-18	12104
Bomberman	Hudson Soft	2007-12-18	20000
Block Breaker Deluxe	Gameloft / Apple Inc.	2008-01-15	21004
Pole Position Remix	Namco	2008-01-21	14003
Naval Battle	Gameloft	2008-02-04	21006
Chess & Backgammon	Gameloft	2008-02-04	21002
Yahtzee	Hasbro	2008-02-11	15014
Pirates of the Caribbean: Aegir's Fire	Disney	2008-02-20	22000
Bubble Bash	Gameloft	2008-02-25	21008
Scrabble	Electronic Arts / Hasbro	2008-03-03	15012
Bejeweled	PopCap Games	2008-04-15	55555 (v1.1 is 12100)
Mahjong	Electronic Arts	2008-04-22	77777 (v1.1 is 77770)
Monopoly	Electronic Arts / Hasbro	2008-06-03	15040
The Sims DJ	Electronic Arts	2008-06-09	15036
Song Summoner: The Unsung Heroes	Square Enix	2008-07-08	24000
Uno	Gameloft	2008-07	22012
Mystery Mansion Pinball	Gameloft	2008-08	22010
Chalkboard Sports Baseball	D2C	2008-08	23000
Spore Origins	Electronic Arts	2008-08-25	15010
Asphalt 4: Elite Racing	Gameloft	2008-08-28	22020
Star Trigon	Namco	2008-09	14006
CSI: Miami	Gameloft	2008-09	22014
Tamagotchi: 'Round the World	Namco	2008-11	14008
Tiger Woods PGA Tour	Electronic Arts	2008-12	15038
Real Soccer '09	Gameloft	2008-12	22018
Slyder Adventures	Sandlot Games	2008-12	25000
Reversi	Apple Inc.	2008-12	11800
Wonder Blocks	Gameloft	2008-12	22022
Lode Runner	Hudson Soft	2008-12	20002
Crystal Defenders	Square Enix	2008-12	24002
Chinese Checkers	Apple Inc.	2008-12	11802
Trivial Pursuit	Electronic Arts / Hasbro	2008-12	15042
Cake Mania 3	Sandlot Games	2009-02-04	25002

=== Default games ===
These are the games that originally came pre-installed on the firmware of various iPods.

iPod version	Titles	Publishers
iPod 1G, 2G	Brick (also called Game)	Apple Inc.
iPod 3G, 4G, 5G, and 5.5G; iPod Nano 1G and 2G; iPod Mini	Brick, Music Quiz, Parachute, Solitaire	Apple Inc.
iPod Nano 3G; iPod Classic 6G	iQuiz, Klondike, Vortex	Apple Inc.
iPod Nano 4G and 5G	Maze, Klondike, Vortex	Apple Inc.

== Criticism ==
Apple faced criticism over international pricing disparities. In the United Kingdom, games were priced at GB£3.99 (approximately US$7.40 at the time), leading to complaints and negative reviews from British users who felt subjected to "Rip-off Britain" pricing. A similar disparity existed in Australia, where games cost A$7.49 (equivalent to $11.10 in 2022).

Independent developers criticized Apple for refusing to release a public software development kit (SDK) for the click-wheel iPod, an intentional decision designed to keep the platform's DRM closed and strictly control software distribution. This closed ecosystem prompted enthusiasts to install alternative operating systems like iPodLinux or Rockbox. These open-source firmware replacements retained media playback while enabling homebrew software, including native ports of Doom and various emulators.

When the iPod Classic and third-generation iPod Nano launched in 2007, previously purchased games were initially incompatible with the new devices, sparking consumer backlash. Additionally, iTunes originally did not allow users to re-download purchased games for free if the local file was lost. Apple eventually updated its policies and software to allow redownloads and cross-device syncing for iPods authorized under a single Apple account.

== Unofficial games ==
As mentioned, alternative firmware like iPodLinux and Rockbox enabled extensive homebrew gaming. Beyond native ports of games like Doom, these projects supported emulators such as Gnuboy, allowing users to play thousands of commercial Game Boy and Game Boy Color titles (such as Super Mario Bros., The Legend of Zelda, and Metroid) directly on the iPod.

== Games using the Notes feature ==
The introduction of a 'Notes' feature on the third-generation iPod in 2003 provided a crude but official avenue for third-party interactive content.

The Notes reader supported basic HTML tags and hyperlinks, which could link to other .txt files or trigger audio playback. However, it was strictly limited to 1,000 files, each capped at a maximum of 4 KB. Because of these strict limitations, developers were largely confined to creating Choose Your Own Adventure–style text adventures or basic multiple-choice trivia games. Consequently, the Notes feature never gained widespread traction as a gaming platform.
