= Phrase book =

Translated phrases of a foreign language

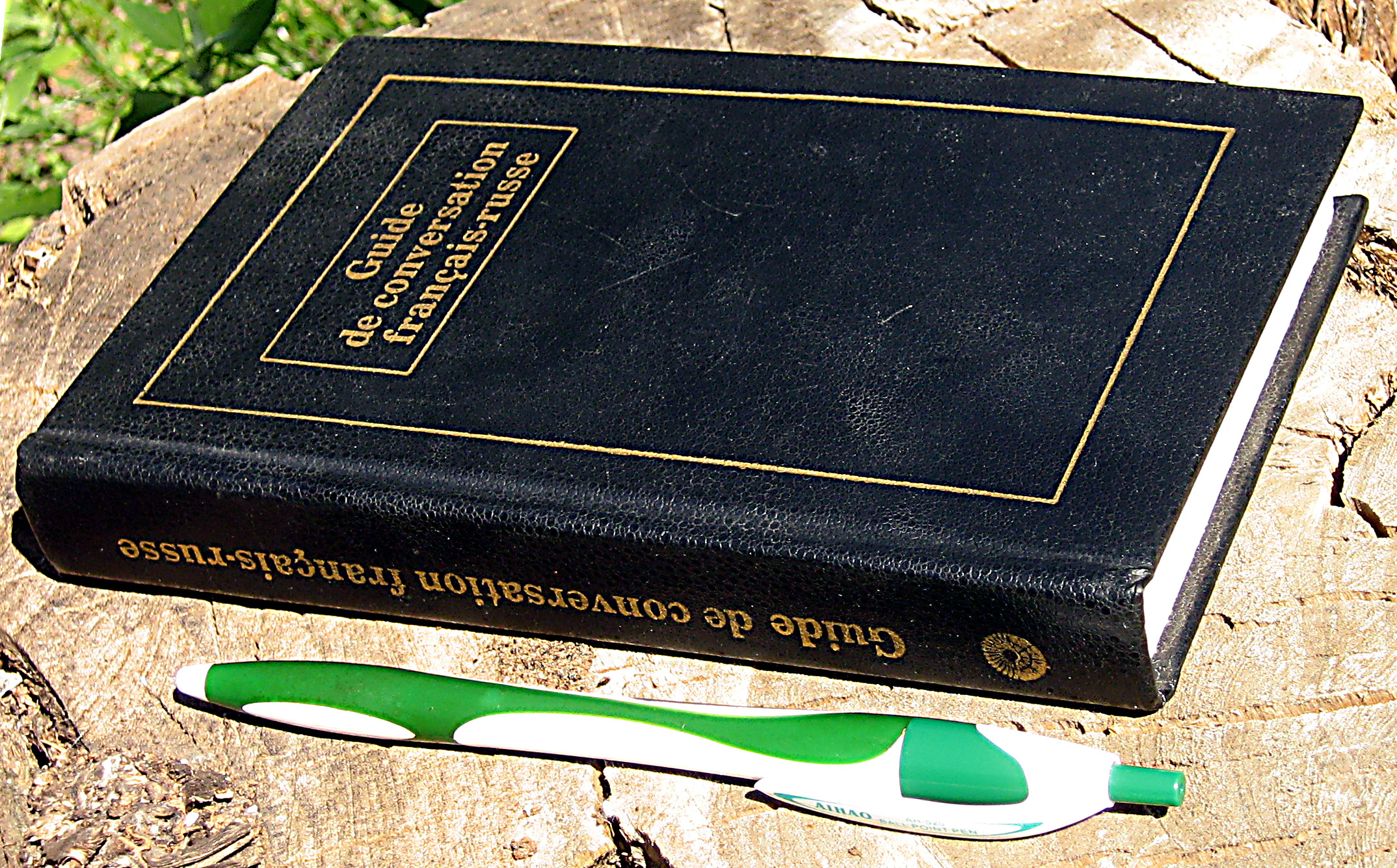
French-Russian conversation phrase book.

A phrase book or phrasebook is a collection of ready-made phrases, usually for a foreign language along with a translation, indexed and often in the form of questions and answers.

== Structure ==
While mostly thematically structured into several chapters like interpersonal relationships, food, at the doctor, shopping etc., a phrase book often contains useful background information regarding the travel destination's culture, customs and conventions besides simple pronunciation guidelines and typically 1000–2000 words covering vocabulary. Also common are a concise grammar and an index intended for quick reference.

A phrase book generally features high clarity and a practical, sometimes color-coded structure to enable its user to communicate in a quick and easy, though very basic, manner. Especially with this in mind a phrase book sometimes also provides several possible answers to each question, to let a person respond in part by pointing at one of them. Additional audio material is often included to help pronunciation and comprehension. This kind of phrase books is often referred to as a talking phrase book or voice translator.

== History ==
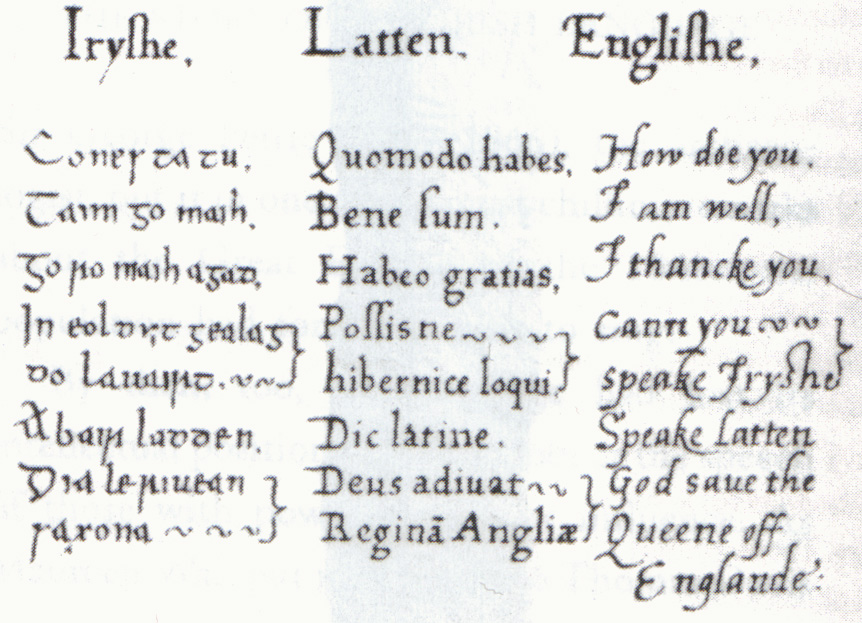
Elizabeth I's Irish and Latin primer, 1560–1580

Hand-written phrase books were used in medieval Europe by pilgrims to the Holy Land; major European languages, Greek, and Hebrew were covered. By the 15th century, phrase books designed for merchants involved in the international trade are attested as well. The earliest known example of this genre is a 1424 manuscript compiled by one Master George of Nuremberg, and intended to help Italian merchants to use High German.

Printed phrase books appeared by the late 15th century, exemplified by the Good Boke to Lerne to Speke French (c. 1493–1496).

In Asia, phrase books were compiled for travelers on the Silk Road already in the first millennium AD, such as a Dunhuang manuscript (Pelliot chinois 5538) containing a set of useful Saka ("Khotanese") and Sanskrit phrases.

Since the 21st century, Lonely Planet has covered more phrase books than any other publisher. They are designed for travelers to communicate with locals learning social phrases and words in more than 120 different languages.

When Coolgorilla released their phrase book with the Apple iPhone in June 2007, they coined the phrase "Talking Phrasebook".

Phrasebooks exist not only for living languages, but also for languages that are no longer spoken natively by anyone, such as Meissner's Latin Phrasebook.

== Notes ==
James Thurber wrote a satirical essay, "There's No Place Like Home", concerning a phrase book he came across in a London bookstore, Collin's Pocket Interpreters: France. The essay appeared in The New Yorker of August 14, 1937, and was later collected in his book My World and Welcome to It.

The British comedian group Monty Python featured a phrase book containing wrong translations in two of their sketches.

English as She Is Spoke is a comic classic of unwittingly incompetent translation.

The expression "My postillion has been struck by lightning", supposedly included in some phrasebooks, is used to describe some of the less likely to be useful phrases found in some books. Dirk Bogarde published a memoir with this title.

A 1972 short story by Joanna Russ, "Useful Phrases for the Tourist", takes the form of an excerpt from a phrase book. Since its initial appearance it has been reprinted nine times, and has been translated into Italian and French.
