= Vortex (iPod game) =

2006 video game

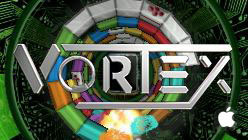
- Developers: Apple Inc. Kabloom Entertainment
- Platforms: iPod 5/5.5g, 3g Nano (Shipped With), Classic (Shipped With)
- Release: September 12, 2006
- Genre: Breakout clone
- Mode: Single-player

Vortex is an iPod game created by Apple Inc. and Kabloom Games. It is an Arkanoid/Breakout clone with a top-down perspective and bricks arranged in a circular layout controlled by a click wheel.

== History ==
On Tuesday, January 30, 2007, Apple introduced a demo version of this game for free. It includes two sample levels. They have since removed the demo.

Vortex is currently one of the only games compatible with all the iPods able to play games (shipped with the iPod Nanos and Classics).

== Gameplay ==
Vortex is similar to Arkanoid/Breakout, in which players use a ball to destroy bricks. However, the bricks are arranged along the inside of a cylinder, with every level having unique design themes. Players use the click wheel to move the paddle around the cylinder to control where the ball goes.

The paddle now is slightly curved, conforming to the game's circular outer wall. The ball moves slower as it approaches the cluster of revolving bricks and faster as it moves away. The effect is similar to that of planetary gravity, except in reverse. The ball's trajectory and speed – whether traveling toward or away from the cluster – is continuously influenced by the pulling forces of the outer wall. The angle at which the ball strikes a brick, or bricks, also affects its direction and, usually to a lesser extent, its speed. The speed of the paddle upon making contact also has a subtle influence on the ball's path.

As game levels progress, the size of the cluster grows and the number of concentric circles comprising it increases. In the early moments of each higher level, the empty ring between the brick cluster and the outer wall grows smaller, a confinement that necessitates quicker paddle movement.

To pass the level, all destructible bricks must be shattered. Adding to the challenge, there are bricks which "retract" for a time, enabling the ball to pass through instead of shattering it. Certain sets of bricks also move around the circle. Other bricks take multiple hits to shatter. Steel bricks are almost indestructible, unless one hits a dynamite brick next to it, or shoots it down with the laser power-up, but are not required to complete the level. Dynamite bricks (indicated by red dots) when hit will take out several other bricks within its blast radius but are also not required. Once the level is complete, the central circular gate of the cylinder will open in a unique animated fashion, transporting players to the next level.

=== Powerups ===
There are marked bricks which release powerups. The powerup, indicated by a small green sphere, heads out from the center and the player catches it to activate it. The powerups include:

- Changes to paddle size. (Shrink or expand).
- Changes to the pace of the game. (Faster or slower).
- Laser or gun attachments.
- Making the paddle sticky.
- Multiple paddles and balls.
- A more powerful ball.
- Extra lives.

Powerup bricks are not required to complete the level, but destroying a powerup brick, even if it is not caught, adds more points to the total than destroying a normal brick. The points score is equal to the points for the bricks destroyed plus the bonus points for timing.

All powerups expire if the player loses a life or beats a level, unless cheats relating to them are active. The exception to this is the extra life powerup, which continues to have effect even after beating a level and expiring after losing a life.

== Critical reception ==
In their review of Vortex, Pocket Gamer highlighted the integration of the iPod's scroll wheel with the 360 degree layout. However, the slow pace of the ball was criticized.

== See also ==
- IPod games
