= Podzilla =

Podzilla:

- PODZILLA is a patented lift system used by PODS
- Podzilla (GUI), used in iPodLinux
- Scott Podsednik, baseball player for the Chicago White Sox
- Podzilla, the resident monster truck of Santa Pod Raceway
