= MultiMediaCard =

Memory card format

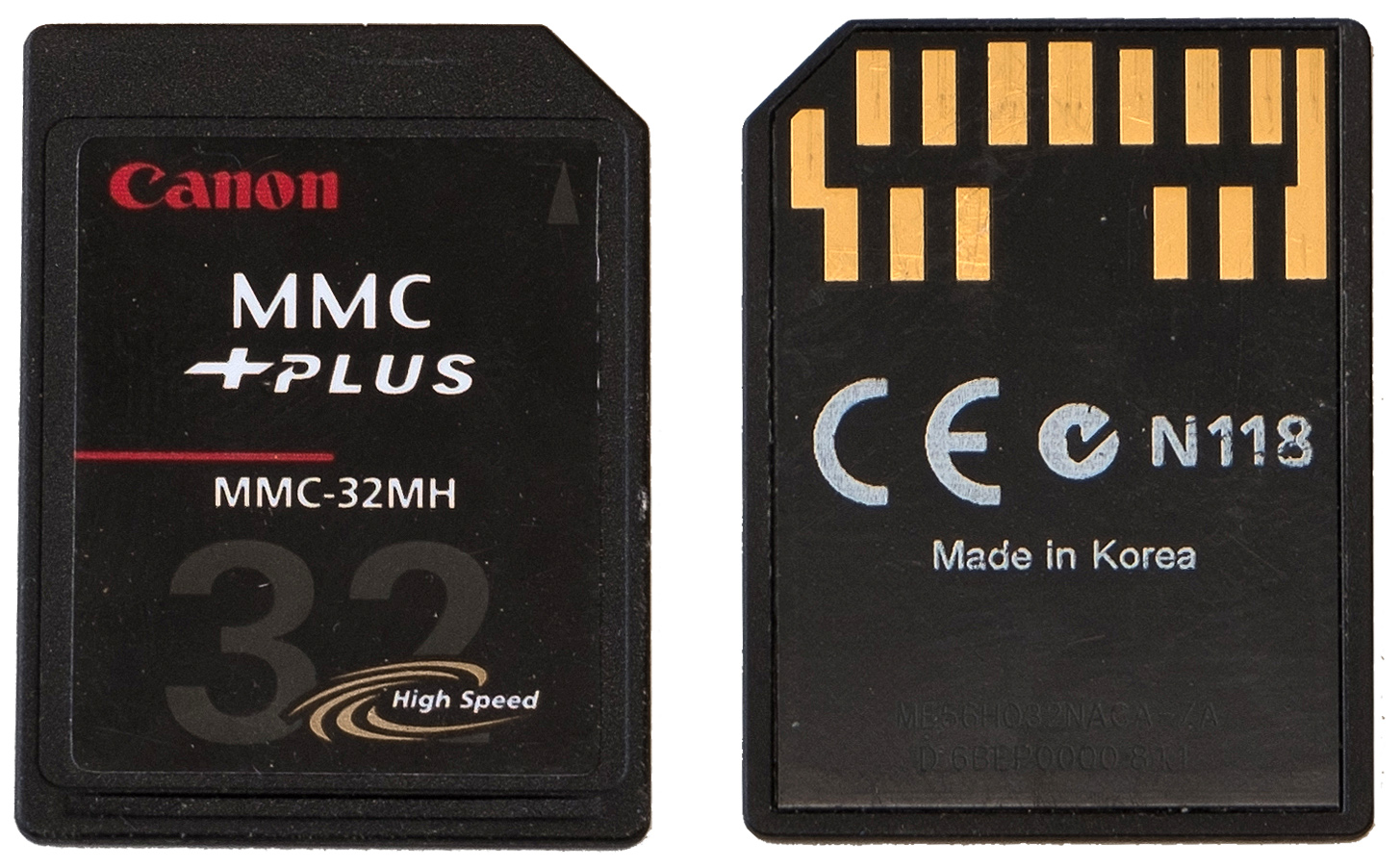
- 32 MB MMCplus card
- Media type: Memory card
- Capacity: Up to 512 GB
- Developed by: JEDEC
- Dimensions: 32 × 24 × 1.4 mm (1.3 × 0.9 × 0.1 in)
- Weight: 2 g (0.071 oz)
- Usage: Portable devices
- Extended to: Secure Digital (SD)
- Released: 1997

MultiMediaCard (MMC) is a memory card standard used for solid-state storage, originally introduced in 1997 by SanDisk, Siemens, and Nokia. Designed as a compact, low-pin-count, postage‑stamp‑sized card alternative to earlier storage solutions, MMC uses a serial interface and a single memory stack assembly, making it smaller and simpler than high-pin-count, parallel-interface cards such as CompactFlash, which was previously developed by SanDisk.

It has since evolved into several variants, including the widely used SD card and the eMMC (embedded MMC) which is soldered directly onto a device's circuit board. While removable MMC cards have largely been supplanted by SD cards, eMMC remains common in low-cost smartphones, tablets, and budget laptops due to its compact size and affordability, despite being slower and less upgradeable than modern solid-state drives.

== History ==
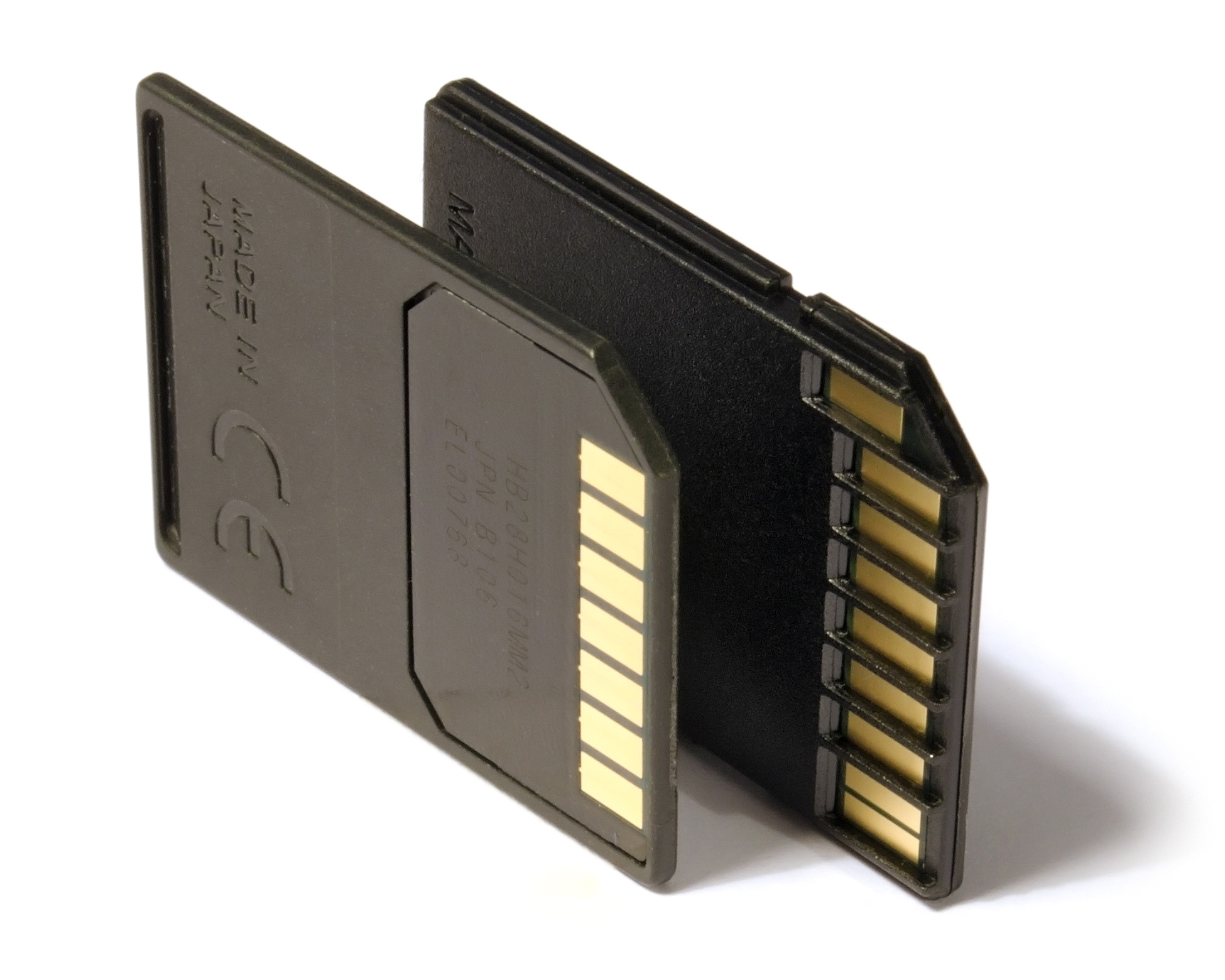
Undersides of an MMC (left) and SD card (right) showing the differences between the two formats

In 1994, SanDisk introduced the CompactFlash format, one of the first commercially successful flash memory card types. CompactFlash outpaced competing formats of the time, including the Miniature Card and SmartMedia. However, the late 1990s saw a proliferation of proprietary memory card formats, such as Memory Stick from Sony and the xD-Picture Card developed by Olympus and Fujifilm, leading to a fragmented and incompatible landscape for removable storage.

In response to this fragmentation, SanDisk partnered with Siemens and Nokia in 1996 to create a universal, compact memory card standard. The resulting format, known as the MultiMediaCard (MMC), was officially introduced in 1997. MMC was designed to be significantly smaller than CompactFlash, with a postage stamp-sized form factor, and to use just seven flat electrical contacts and a simplified serial interface, reducing complexity in host devices. The MultiMediaCard Association (MMCA), was founded in 1998 by 14 companies to promote adoption of the format.

Compared to the physically larger CompactFlash, which relied on 50-pin parallel interfaces and traditional surface-mount assembly, MMC offered a more streamlined and mobile-friendly design, which the MMCA hoped would make it attractive for use in portable consumer electronics such as digital cameras, handheld devices, and mobile phones.

Despite its technical advantages, MMC adoption was limited. Even Nokia, one of the original backers, was slow to integrate MMC into its popular handsets. In an effort to boost adoption, the MMCA introduced revised specifications between 2004 and 2007, including reduced power consumption, support for smaller form factors, and increased storage capacities. However, these updates had limited market impact.

MMC technology served as the foundation for the development of the Secure Digital (SD) card standard. Introduced in 1999 by SanDisk, Panasonic, and Toshiba, SD was based on the MMC electrical interface but added digital rights management (DRM), more durable casing, and a mechanical write-protect switch. These enhancements, along with broad manufacturer support, led SD to surpass MMC in popularity. Many early SD-compatible devices also supported MMC cards.

MMC's most enduring legacy came in the form of its embedded variant, eMMC (embedded MultiMediaCard). First introduced by the JEDEC Solid State Technology Association in 2006 with version 4.0 of the standard, eMMC adapted the MMC architecture for non-removable storage integrated directly onto a device's motherboard. The eMMC format proved especially successful in smartphones, tablets, Chromebooks, and other low-cost computing devices due to its low cost, compact size, and adequate performance for basic tasks.

On September 23, 2008, the MMCA formally transferred control of the MMC specification to JEDEC. While JEDEC continued to update the eMMC standard, removable MMC cards saw little further development. As of 2025, the format has largely faded from use. eMMC itself is gradually being supplanted in performance-oriented applications by newer technologies such as Universal Flash Storage (UFS) and solid-state drives (SSDs), although it remains in use in budget-conscious and embedded devices.

== MMC card variants ==
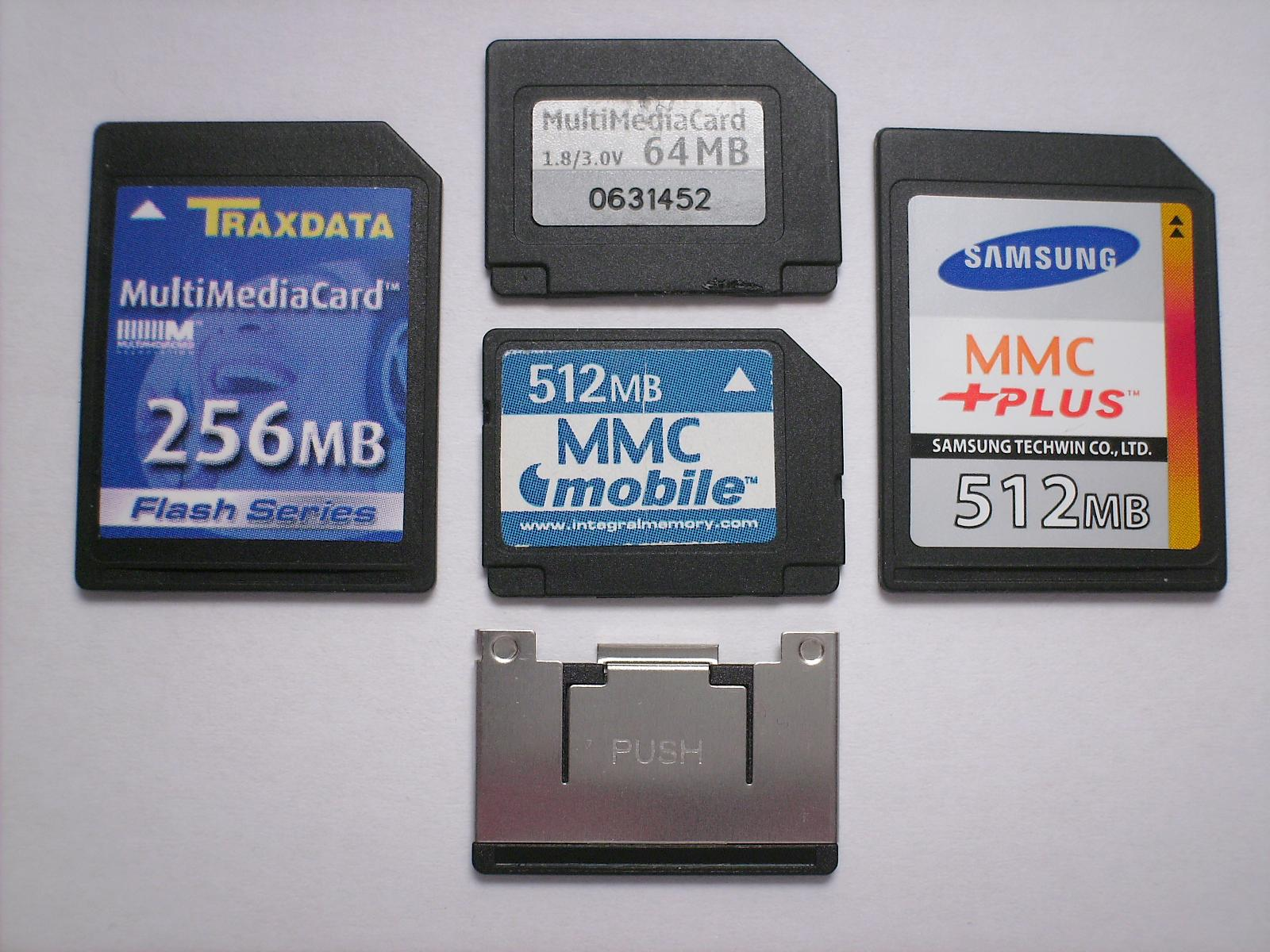
Top of four types of MMC cards (clockwise from left): MMC, RS-MMC, MMCplus, MMCmobile, metal extender

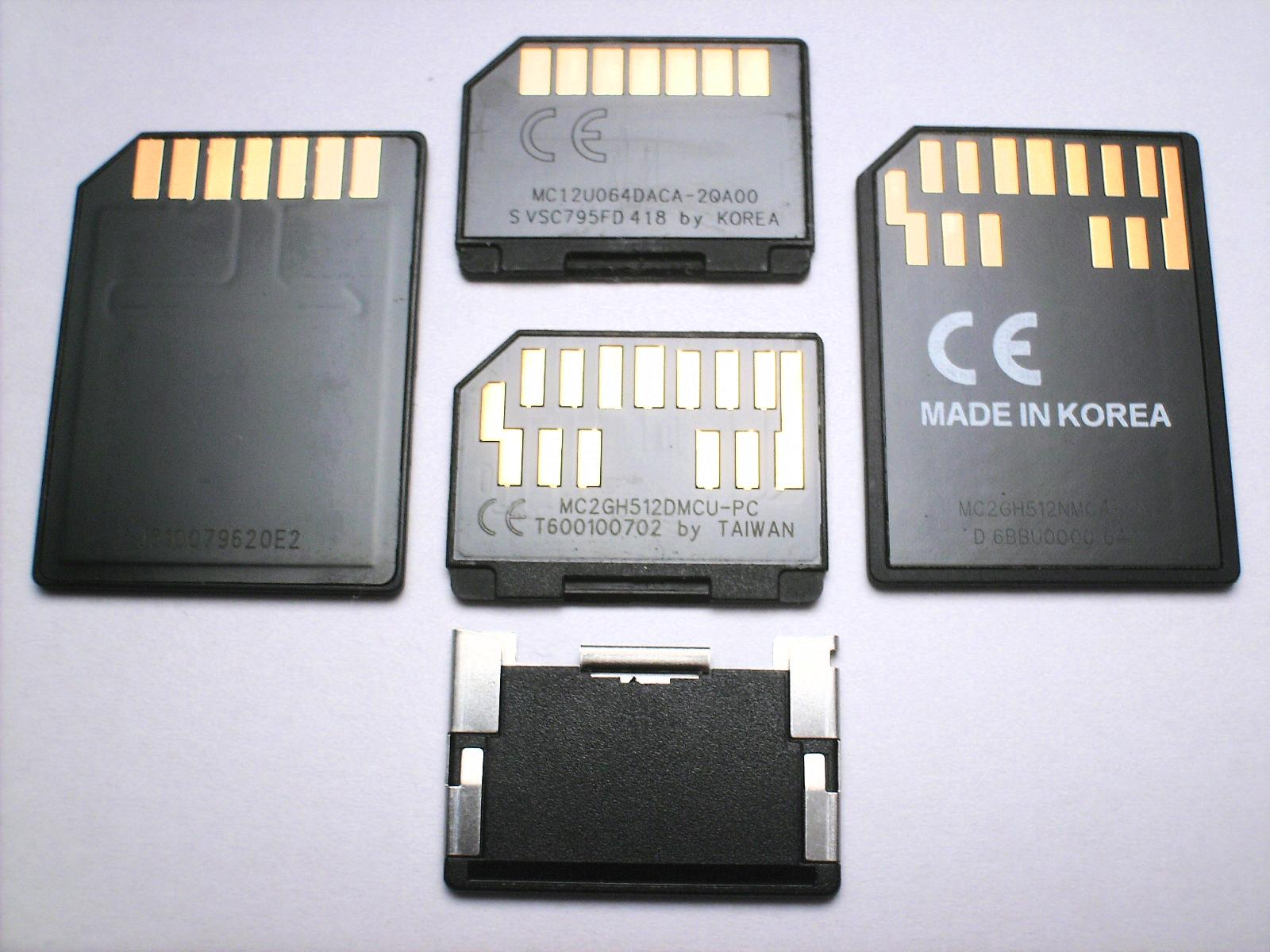
Bottom of the same four cards

=== RS-MMC ===
Reduced Size MultiMediaCard (RS‑MMC), introduced in 2002, is a smaller variant of MMC, measuring approximately 24 by 18 by 1.4 millimetres (0.945 in × 0.709 in × 0.055 in), about half the height of a standard MMC. It uses a simple extender to work in standard MMC or SD slots and was available in capacities up to 2 GB. Some manufacturers, including Nokia and Siemens, briefly adopted RS‑MMC in their early Symbian-based smartphones and tablets.

=== DV-MMC ===
Dual Voltage MMC (DV‑MMC, also called the Low Voltage MMC) supported 1.8 V alongside the normal 3.3 V operation to reduce power consumption in mobile devices. This variant was first proposed in 2001, but wasn't widely available until 2004, and was soon overtaken by the more capable MMCplus and MMCmobile formats.

=== MMCplus, MMCmobile and MMCmicro ===
MMCmicro

The MMCplus and MMCmobile formats were introduced in 2004 and the MMCmicro format in 2005 as part of version 4 of the MMC specification with several enhancements to improve performance and better compete with SD cards. These enhancements included support for higher clock speeds (26 MHz and 52 MHz alongside the normal 20 MHz) and wider data buses (8‑bit alongside the previous 1- and 4‑bit), which combined to enable a 52 Mbit/s transfer rate, alongside dual-voltage support (1.8 V and 3.3 V) carried over from DV‑MMC.

The full‑size enhanced format was marketed as MMCplus, while its smaller counterpart, matching the size of RS-MMC, was known as MMCmobile. Cards have 13 flat electrical contacts to support 8‑bit data buses. Both formats maintained backward compatibility with devices with standard MMC readers, though without support for some of their advanced features.

The MMCmicro format featured a compact 14 by 12 by 1.1 millimetres (0.551 in × 0.472 in × 0.043 in) form factor to compete with microSD cards. It supported dual-voltage and high-speed 4‑bit operation, though it lacked the pins required for an 8‑bit bus. MMCmicro cards could be used with an adapter for use in full-size MMC slots.

=== MiCard ===
The miCARD (Multiple Interface Card) was a high‑capacity MMC variant proposed in 2007 that could be plugged directly into a USB port eliminating the need for dedicated card slots or separate card readers and could be used in standard MMC/SD slots via an adapter. The card would have been slightly smaller than a RS-MMC/MMCmobile card, but larger than MMCmicro at 21 by 12 by 1.95 millimetres (0.827 in × 0.472 in × 0.077 in). Despite backing from several Taiwanese companies, MiCard never reached mass production.

== Embedded MMC ==
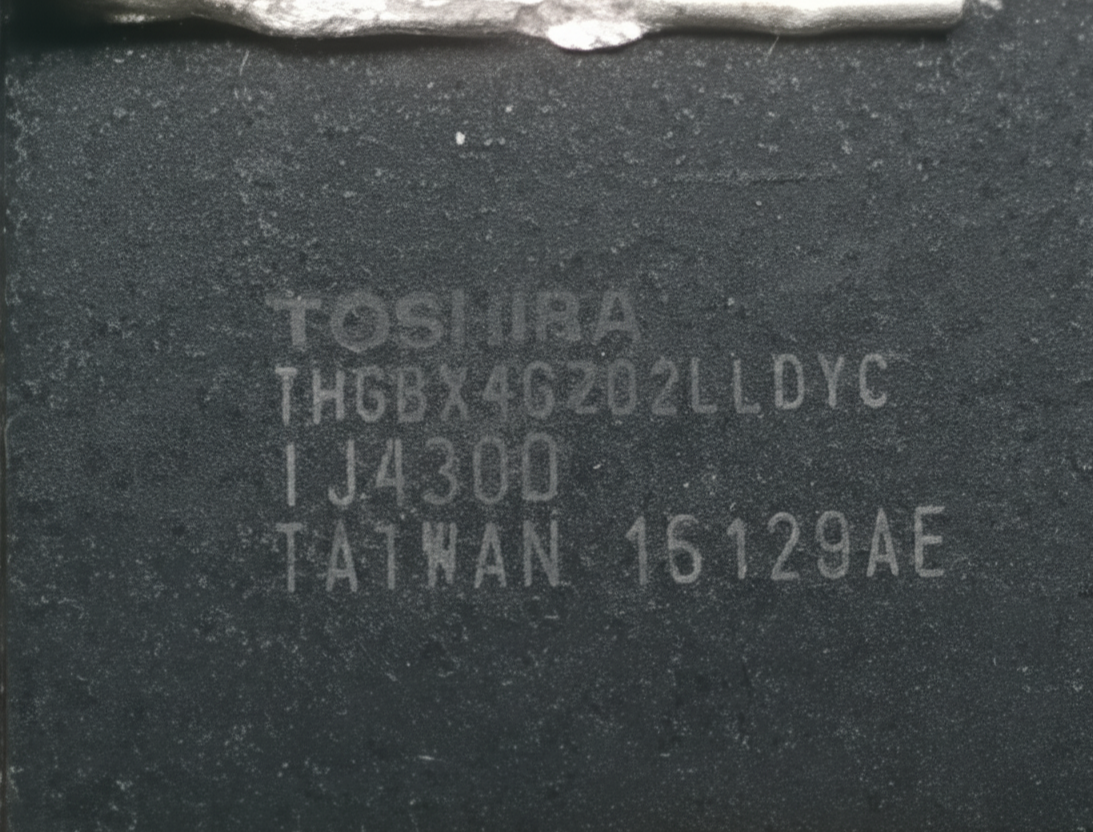
eMMC chip inside the iPad mini 2

The embedded MultiMediaCard (eMMC, officially branded as e•MMC) is a type of internal storage that integrates NAND flash memory, a buffer, and a controller into a single ball grid array (BGA) package. Unlike other forms of removable card-based MMC storage, eMMC is permanently soldered onto a device's printed circuit board (PCB) and is not user-removable or upgradeable. The onboard controller manages tasks such as error correction and data handling, reducing the workload on the device's main processor. eMMC chips use an 8-bit parallel interface and are available in various physical sizes and storage capacities.

The eMMC standard was first introduced by the JEDEC Solid State Technology Association in 2006 with version 4.0, which adapted the original card-based MMC specification for embedded (non-removable) and mobile applications. Between 2007 and 2012, the version 4 standard was revised multiple times to improve performance and introduce features such as secure erase and on-system firmware updates. Version 5.0, released in 2013, introduced the HS400 interface mode, enabling theoretical data transfer speeds of up to 400 MB/s, along with enhancements to reliability and boot performance. This was followed by version 5.1 in 2015, which added command queuing and further reliability improvements. The most recent update, version 5.1A, was released in 2019 and included minor refinements to the standard.

eMMC became widely used as the primary storage medium in early smartphones, and later in low-cost laptop computers, Chromebooks, tablet computers, and other compact computing devices. While it was gradually supplanted in higher-performance devices by alternatives such as Universal Flash Storage (UFS) in smartphones and solid-state drives (SSDs) in computers, eMMC continued to be used in entry-level products due to its low cost, compact form factor, low power consumption, and adequate performance for everyday tasks such as web browsing, email, and video streaming.

While eMMC is faster and more power-efficient than traditional hard disk drives, it is slower than most SSDs, especially those using NVMe over PCI Express. These speed limitations make it less suited for applications involving large files or intensive computing needs, such as gaming or video editing. Its lack of upgradeability also limits its appeal in more advanced systems, as users cannot replace or expand storage after purchase.

eMMC versions
Version	Introduced	Sequential read (MB/s)	Sequential write (MB/s)	Random read (IOPS)	Random write (IOPS)
4.3	2007	52	48		
4.5	2012	150	50	7,000	2,000
5.0	2013	250	90	7,000	13,000
5.1	2015	250	125	11,000	13,000

Higher capacity variants of eMMC reach higher writing speeds. While the reading speed of eMMC 5.0 remains constant at 250 MB/s throughout its storage options, a 64 GB eMMC 5.0 writes at up to 90 MB/s, more than six times faster than the 14 MB/s of the lowest storage option of 4 GB.

== Similar formats ==
In 2004, a group of companies—including Seagate and Hitachi—introduced an interface called CE-ATA for small form factor hard disk drives. This interface was electrically and physically compatible with the MMC specification. However, support for further development of the standard ended in 2008.

The game card format used on the PlayStation Vita was found to be based on the MMC standard, but with a different pinout and support for custom initialization commands as well as copy protection.

== See also ==
- Comparison of memory cards
