= Block Breaker Deluxe 2 =

2008 video game

- Developer(s): Gameloft
- Publisher(s): Gameloft
- Platform(s): Mobile phone, iOS, Android
- Release: Mobile phone 2008 iOS & Android; September 2008
- Genre(s): Breakout clone
- Mode(s): Single-player, multiplayer

Block Breaker Deluxe 2 is a video game developed by Gameloft for mobile phones. It is a sequel to Block Breaker Deluxe. It was released for iOS and Android. Gameloft claims that it is the most played arcade wall breaking on mobile platforms. Unlike the original, the game is not available on WiiWare, N-Gage, or Windows.

== Gameplay ==
The game and the object is similar to the original. Improvements include addition of more power-ups, locations, levels, and challenges, as well as more goods in the shop and new designed blocks.
