= IPod Classic =

Portable media players by Apple (2001–2014)

iPod Classic
- Digital rendering of the iPod Classic 6th generation in silver
- Manufacturer: Apple
- Product family: iPod
- Type: Portable media player
- Lifespan: November 10, 2001 – September 9, 2014 (12 years, 9 months)
- Discontinued: September 9, 2014
- Media: 5, 10, 15, 20, 30, 40, 60, 80, 120 or 160 GB 1.8" hard drive
- Operating system: 1.5 (1G, 2G); 2.3 (3G); 3.1.1 (4G); 1.2.1 (4G Color); 1.3 (5G); 1.1.2 (6G); 2.0.5 (6G, 2009)
- Display: 1G–4G: 160 x 128 px, 2 in (51 mm), monochrome LCD; Color: 220 x 176 px, 2 in (51 mm), color LCD; 5G–6G: 320 x 240 px, 2.5 in (64 mm), color LCD
- Input: 1G: Scroll wheel 2G–3G: Touch wheel 4G–6G: Click wheel
- Connectivity: 1G–4G: FireWire; 3G–6G: USB 2.0
- Power: 1G–2G: Lithium polymer battery 3G–6G: Lithium-ion battery
- Successor: iPod Touch
- Related: iPod Shuffle iPod mini iPod Nano iPod Touch iPhone
- Made in: China
- Website: Official website (archived)

The iPod Classic (stylized and marketed as iPod classic and originally simply iPod) is a discontinued portable media player created and formerly marketed by Apple.

There were six distinct generations of the iPod Classic, as well as a spin-off (the iPod Photo) that was later re-integrated into the main iPod line. All generations used a 1.8-inch (46 mm) hard drive for storage. The "classic" suffix was formally introduced with the rollout of the sixth-generation iPod on September 5, 2007. Prior generations of the device had simply been marketed as the "iPod". It was available in silver or black from 2007 onwards, replacing the "signature iPod white".

On September 9, 2014, Apple discontinued the iPod Classic. The 2009 revision of the sixth-generation iPod Classic and the 5th generation iPod Nano are the last Apple products to use the distinctive click wheel.

== Technical information ==
=== User interface ===
The iPod's signature click wheel

iPods with color displays use anti-aliased graphics and text, with sliding animations. All iPods have five buttons and the later generations (4th and above) have the buttons integrated into the click wheel — a design which gives an uncluttered, minimalist interface, though the circuitry contains multiple momentary button switches. The buttons are:

- Menu: to traverse backward through the menus, toggle the backlight on older iPods, and jump to the main menu on newer iPods
- Center: to select a menu item
- Play / Pause: this doubles as an off switch when held
- Skip Forward / Fast Forward
- Skip Backwards / Rewind

=== Additional features ===
In March 2002, Apple added limited PDA-like functionality: text files can be displayed, while contacts and schedules can be viewed and synchronized with the host computer. Some built-in games are available, including Brick (a clone of Breakout), Parachute, Solitaire, and iPod Quiz. A firmware update released in September 2006 brought some extra features to fifth-generation iPods including adjustable screen brightness, gapless playback, and downloadable games. However, as of September 30, 2011, these games are no longer available on the iTunes Store.

=== Operating system and firmware ===
The iPod's operating system uses a separate dedicated storage medium. An additional NOR flash ROM chip (either 1 MB or 512 KB) contains a bootloader program that tells the device to load its OS from the storage medium. Each iPod also has 32 MB of RAM, although the larger capacity fifth generation models and the sixth-generation models have 64 MB. A portion of the RAM is used to hold the iPod OS loaded from firmware, but the majority of it serves to cache songs from the storage medium. For example, an iPod could spin its hard disk up once and copy approximately 30 MB of upcoming songs into RAM, thus saving power by not requiring the drive to spin up for each song. Custom firmware has also been developed such as Rockbox and iPodLinux which offer open-source alternatives to the standard firmware and operating system.

== History ==
=== 1st generation ===
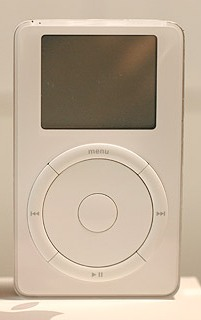
iPod (1st gen), 2001

Apple introduced the first-generation iPod (M8541) on October 23, 2001, with the slogan "1,000 songs in your pocket". They went on sale on November 10, 2001. The first iPod had a monochrome LCD (liquid-crystal display) screen and featured a 5 GB hard drive capable of storing 1,000 songs (encoded using MP3 160kbit/s, fewer if using a higher bitrate) and was priced at US$399. Among the iPod's innovations were its small size, achieved using a 1.8" hard drive, whereas other HDD-based competitors (like earlier DEC Personal Jukebox player) were using 2.5" hard drives at the time, and its easy-to-use navigation, which was controlled using a mechanical scroll wheel (unlike later iPods, which had touch-sensitive scroll wheels), a center select button, and four auxiliary buttons around the wheel. The iPod had a rated battery life of ten hours.

On March 20, 2002, Apple introduced a 10 GB model of the first-generation iPod for US$499. VCard compatibility was added, allowing iPods to display business card information synced from a Mac.

=== 2nd generation ===
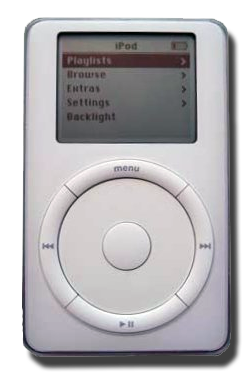
iPod (2nd gen), 2002

The second-generation of the iPod was introduced on July 17, 2002. They went on sale in August 2002. Using a similar body style as the first generation, the top of the iPod was redesigned, switching from a single swooping cutout in the backplate to mount the FireWire port, hold switch and headphone assembly, to individual ports being cut into the backplate to allow these ports to be accessed. Furthermore, the hold switch was redesigned, a cover was added to the FireWire port, and the mechanical wheel was replaced with a touch-sensitive wheel. The second-generation class was available in 10GB for US$399 and 20 GB for US$499. The first-generation 5GB iPod was carried over, but its price was reduced to US$299.

Notably, the second-generation iPods and the updated first-generation iPod were now Windows-compatible. These versions came with a 4-pin to 6-pin FireWire adapter and were bundled with Musicmatch Jukebox. At that time iTunes was Mac only and unavailable for Windows.

In December 2002, Apple unveiled its first limited-edition iPods, with either Madonna's, Tony Hawk's, or Beck's signature or No Doubt's band logo engraved on the back for an extra US$50.

=== 3rd generation ===
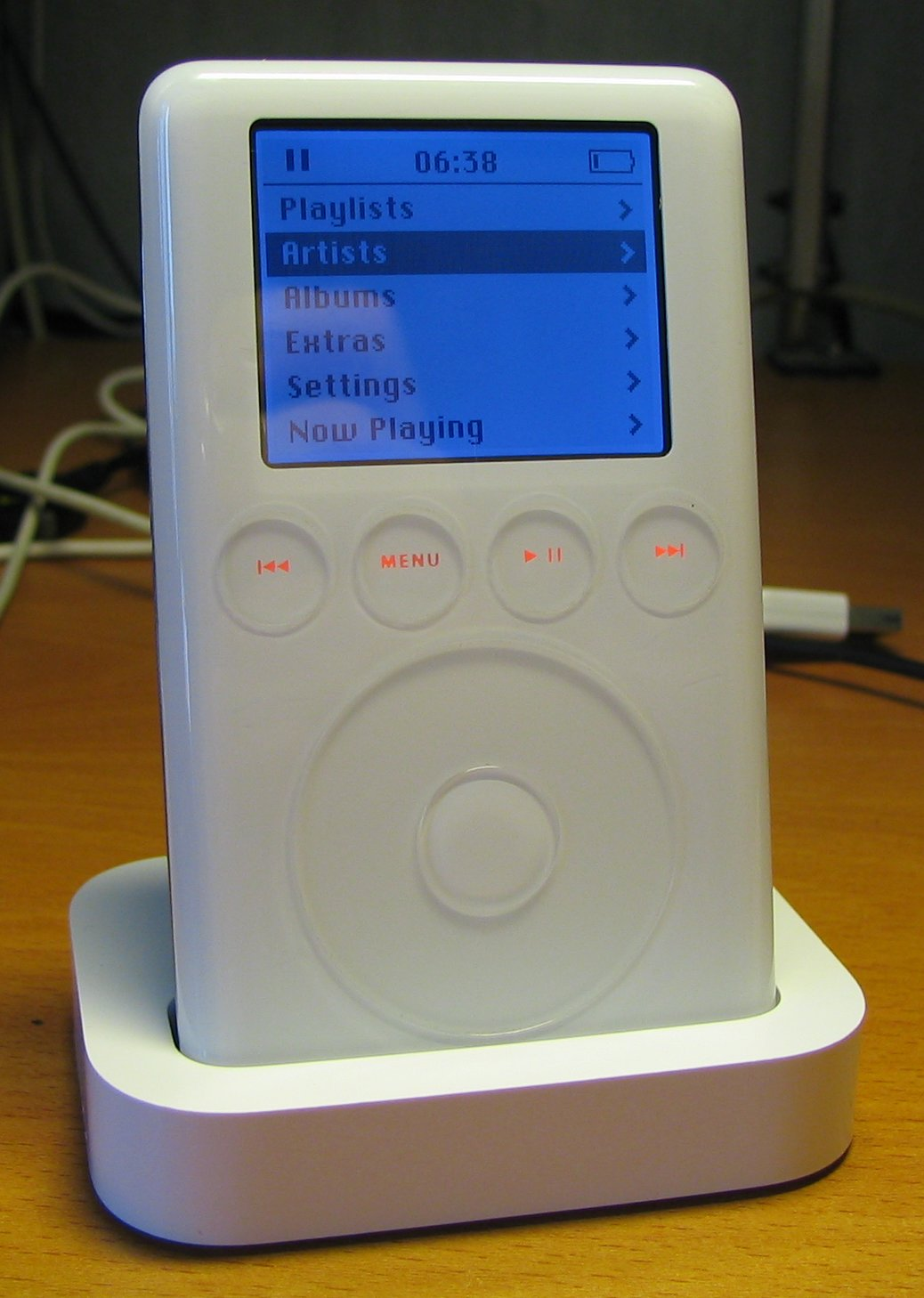
iPod (3rd gen), 2003

On April 28, 2003, Apple announced a completely redesigned third-generation iPod. They went on sale on May 2, 2003. Thinner than the previous models, the third-generation models replaced the FireWire port with a new proprietary 30-pin Dock Connector and introduced the Touch Wheel, a completely non-mechanical interface with the four auxiliary buttons located in a row between the screen and the touch wheel. The front plate had rounded edges, and the rear casing was slightly rounded as well. A new wired remote connector was introduced. Whereas first and second-generation iPods had an auxiliary ring around the headphone port for the remote, the third-generation iPods had a 4-pin jack adjacent to the headphone port. A 10 GB model was sold for US$299, a 15 GB model for US$399, and a 30 GB model for US$499. All iPods were now compatible with Mac and Windows out of the box, simply requiring Windows users to reformat the iPod before use on a PC and both iTunes and Musicmatch Jukebox were bundled with all iPods. The battery life was reduced to 8 hours, partially due to the use of a smaller lithium-ion battery as opposed to a lithium-polymer battery.

The 15 GB model was replaced by a 20 GB model and the 30 GB model was upgraded to 40 GB on September 8, 2003. The Windows-based Musicmatch Jukebox software was made obsolete and replaced by iTunes 4.1, the first version available for Microsoft Windows.

=== 4th generation ===
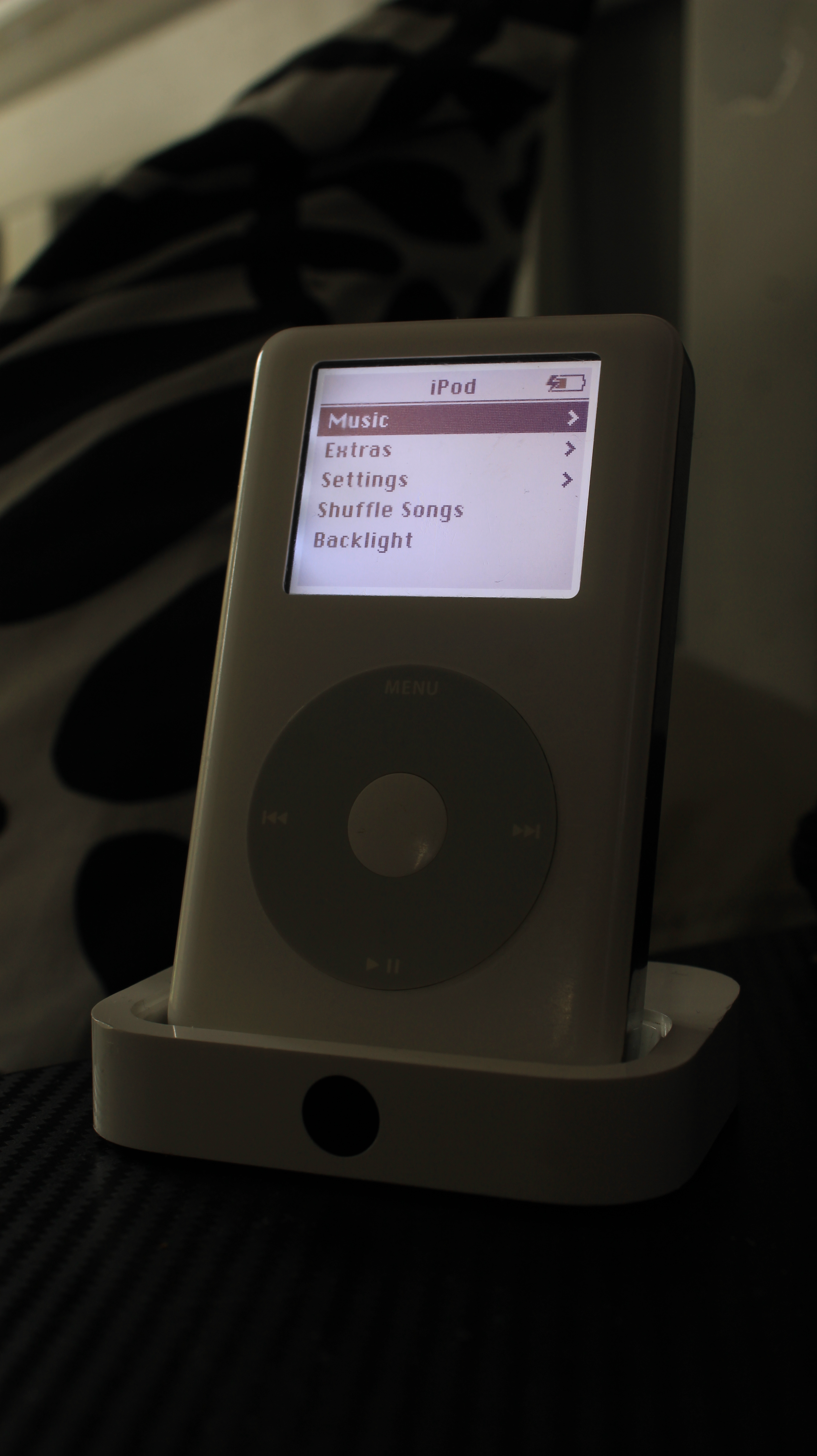
iPod 4th generation (Monochrome) in its dock

Announced on July 19, 2004, the fourth-generation iPod replaced the touch wheel from the third-generation iPod with the Click Wheel from the iPod Mini, putting the four auxiliary buttons underneath a touch-sensitive scroll wheel. The casing was also slightly slimmer. Pricing was reduced and the lineup was simplified, as the 20 GB model was sold for US$299 and the 40 GB model for US$399. Notably, Apple began reducing pack-in accessories starting with the fourth generation. While a dock, carrying case, and wired remote were previously included with higher-end iPods, the higher-level 40 GB iPod only came with a dock, earphones and an interchangeable proprietary cable capable of USB and FireWire interface. In addition to using the iPod Mini's Click Wheel, the fourth-generation iPod used the more energy-efficient components of the Mini, allowing the fourth-generation iPod to over 12 hours of battery life while using the same battery as its predecessor.

A special U2 edition was announced on October 26, 2004, to cross-market U2's How to Dismantle an Atomic Bomb album. The plastic front piece of the U2 edition iPod was black and the scroll wheel was red, to coincide with the color scheme of the U2 album. With 20 GB and the signatures of all four members of U2, the special edition iPod was priced at US$349 and also included a US$50 coupon for a US$149 collection of U2's entire back catalog. U2 iPod customers also received 30 minutes of exclusive U2 video downloadable from the iTunes Music Store.

A Special Harry Potter Edition was announced on September 7, 2005. It was released in conjunction with the Harry Potter audiobooks in iTunes. It had a Hogwarts logo engraved on the back, and all six Harry Potter audiobooks which were available at the time preloaded.

==== iPod Photo ====
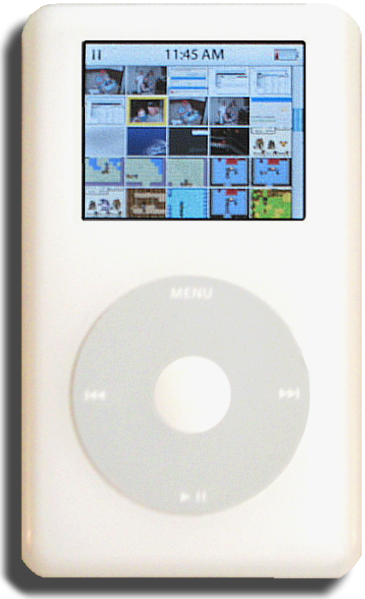
iPod Photo, 2004

On October 26, 2004, in addition to the U2 edition, Apple also unveiled the iPod Photo. Positioned as a premium version of the standard fourth-generation iPod, the iPod Photo featured a 220×176-pixel LCD capable of displaying up to 65,536 colors. The device can be attached to a television or other external display for slideshows, thanks to a bundled composite cable which fits in the headphone port ("iPod AV cable"); it is also forwards compatible with then-future dock connector based composite and S-video accessories. Photos are stored in a proprietary database, which iTunes can generate from JPEG, BMP, GIF, TIFF, and PNG file formats sourced from either a folder, from Apple's iPhoto on the Macintosh, Adobe Photoshop Album 2.0 or Photoshop Elements 3.0 on Windows. Battery life was rated 15 hours for music playback and 5 hours for slideshows with music. The iPod Photo was available in a 40GB version for US$499 and a 60GB version for US$599.

On February 23, 2005, both 40 GB models (photo and regular) were replaced with a slimmer and lower-priced (US$349) 30GB photo model leaving only a 20 GB black-and-white iPod left. The price for the 60 GB model was dropped to US$449 with fewer bundled accessories, making the dock, FireWire cable, and television cable extra-cost options. On the same day, Apple announced the iPod Camera Connector which allowed instant transfer of images from a USB-compatible digital camera to the iPod Photo. The main difference between this and Belkin's Digital Camera Link was that Apple's unit supported instant image viewing on the iPod Photo after transfer without having to connect the iPod Photo to a computer first.

==== iPod with color display ====
On June 28, 2005, just nine months after its introduction, the iPod Photo was merged with the rest of the iPod line. The 30 GB model was dropped, and the 20 GB monochrome iPod received a color screen. The price for the 60 GB model was also dropped to US$399.

=== 5th generation ("iPod video") ===
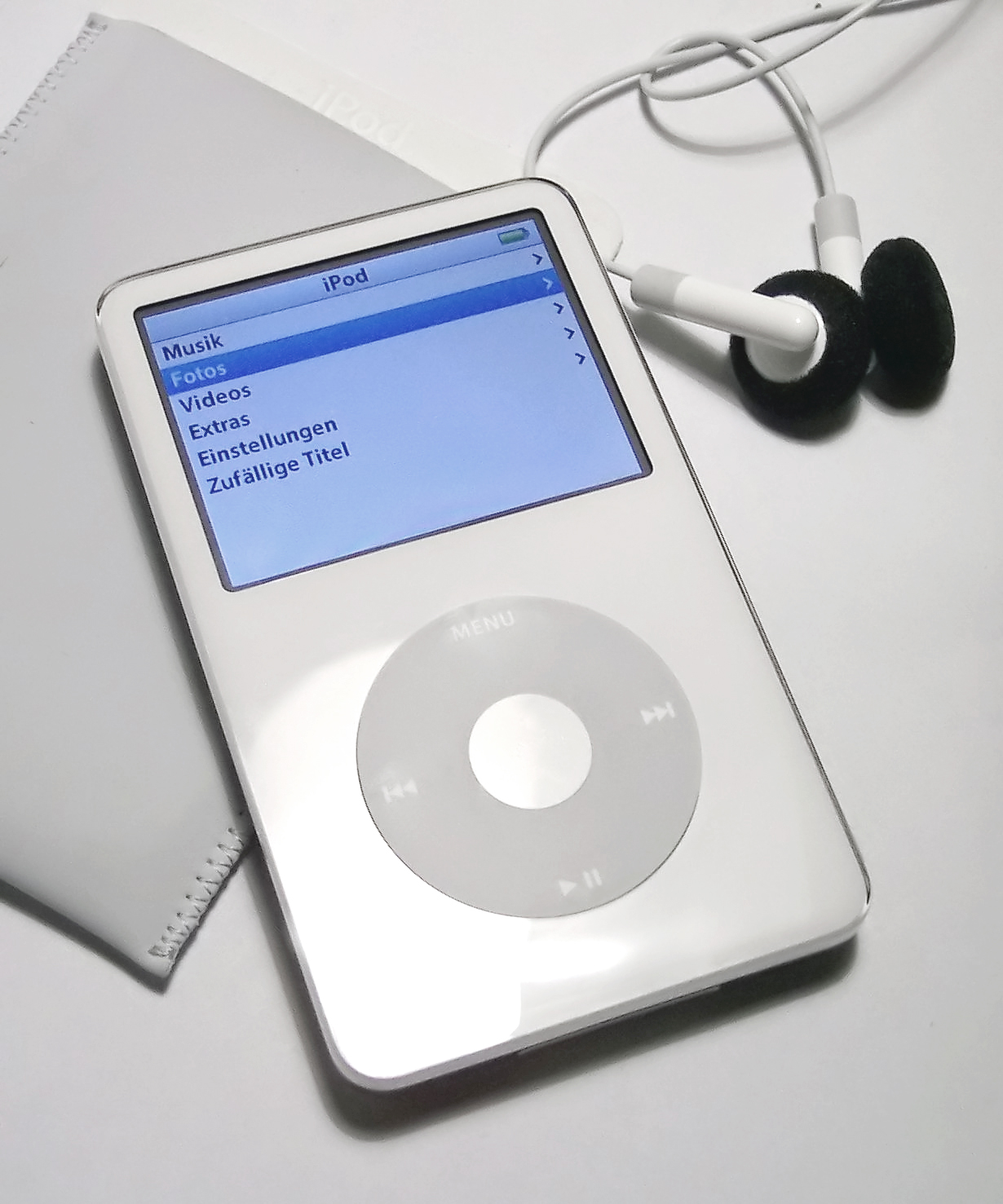
iPod (5th gen), 2005

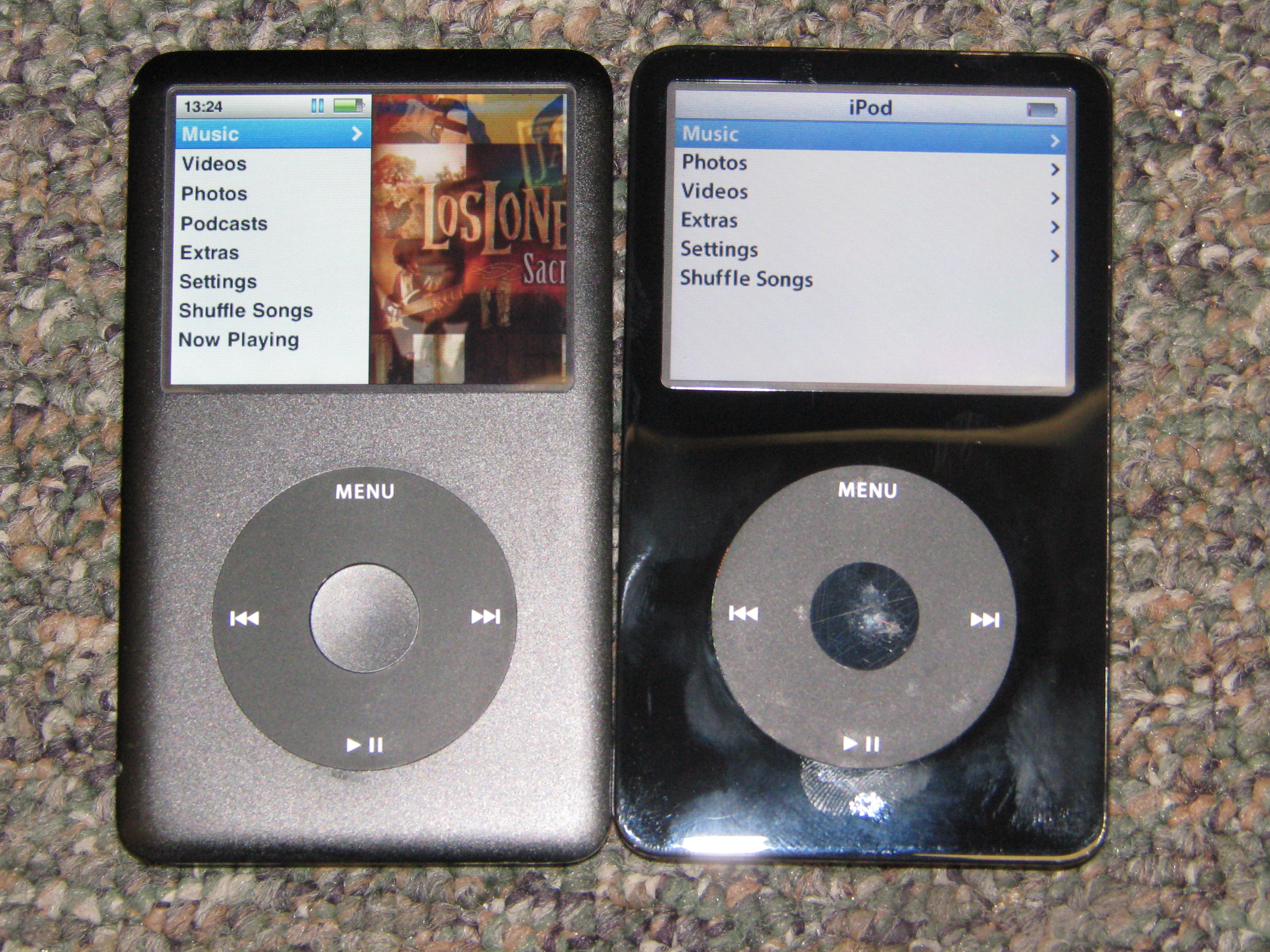
iPod classic (6th gen) (left) & iPod (5th gen) (right): showing the updated view feature

The fifth-generation iPod was introduced on October 12, 2005, shortly after the introduction of the iPod Nano. The fifth-generation iPod featured a 2.5" 320×240 QVGA screen and a smaller Click Wheel. It was the first iPod to be able to play videos.

The fifth-generation iPod, sometimes known as the "iPod video", is the first iPod to be available in an alternative color scheme in a non-special-edition form, as a black option was added alongside "Signature iPod White", and marked the second full redesign of the iPod's aesthetic with its re-arranged proportions, its return to a fully flat front plate, and its more rounded rear casing. The 4-pin remote port was removed as well, causing backwards compatibility issues with certain accessories. A 30 GB model was offered for US$299 and a 60 GB model was offered for US$399. The fifth-generation iPod was also offered in the U2 special edition for US$349 with 30 GB. The fifth-generation iPod was the last model to have a plastic face.

The fifth-generation iPod has a Broadcom BCM2722 VideoCore 2 graphics processor which provides acceleration to play video in MPEG-4 (up to 480p 2.5 Mbit/s) and H.264 (up to 240p, 768 kbit/s, baseline profile level 1.3 only) formats. The enhanced fifth-generation iPod, as well as firmware 1.2 for its predecessor, upgrade H.264 support to 480p 1.5 Mbit/s. As is the case for music, video content such as TV shows, podcasts, music videos, and movies may be purchased from the iTunes Store (with DRM, with rental options launched later), or sourced externally and imported via iTunes.

Videos or photo slideshows may be played from the fifth-generation iPod on a television set, projector or monitor with the use of the Apple Composite AV cable or via an older dock providing an S-Video output. It is also possible to obtain composite video from the headphone jack, using an iPod AV Cable or generic equivalent (appropriately wired TRRS minijack), a feature removed from the following generation.

==== Revision ====
An updated fifth-generation iPod model was released on September 12, 2006, and is unofficially referred to as the "5.5th generation". It included a brighter screen, longer video playback time, improved video decoding hardware, newly designed earphones and a search feature. An iTunes installation CD was also no longer bundled, requiring users to download iTunes from Apple's website. The 60GB model was replaced with an 80 GB model, and prices were cut by US$50 for both the 30 GB (US$249) and the 80 GB (US$349) models. Gapless playback and support for iPod games was enabled on all fifth-generation iPods through a firmware update released at the same time.

=== 6th generation ===
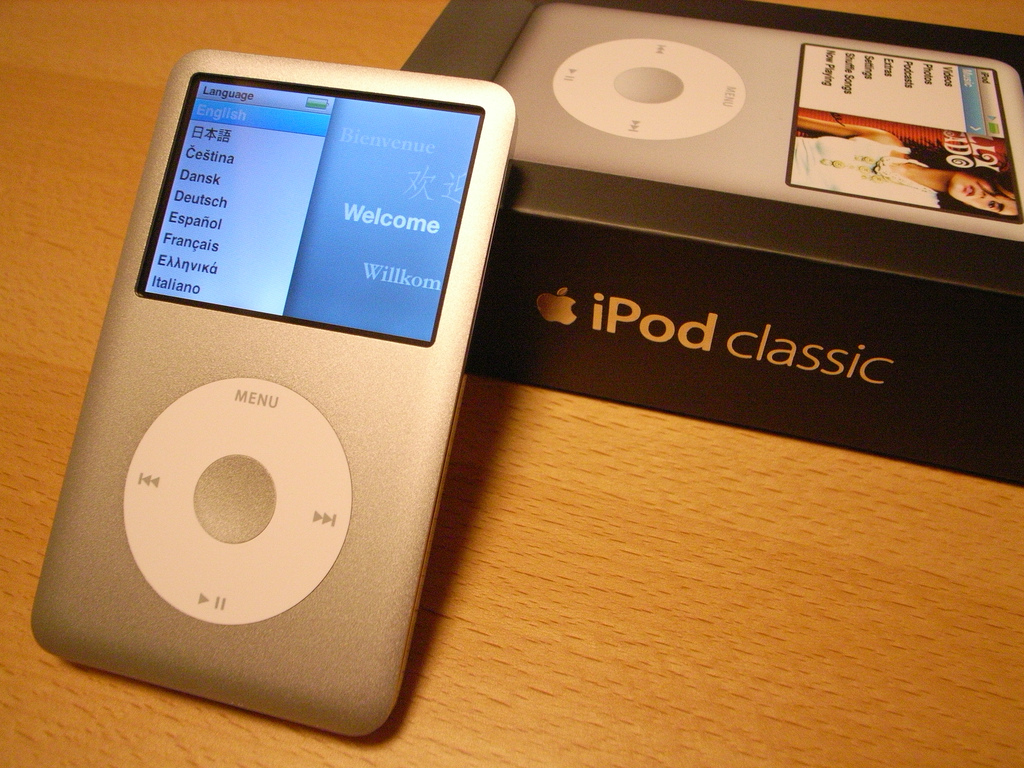
iPod classic (6th gen), 2007

During a special iPod marketing event on September 5, 2007, Steve Jobs introduced the sixth-generation iPod and the suffix "Classic", which distinguished it from the new iPod Touch based on the design of the iPhone. Featuring slightly thinner bodies, the sixth-generation iPod also had dramatically improved battery life, claiming up to 36 hours of music playback and 6 hours of video playback. The iPod Classic has a 2.5" backlit display at a resolution of 320×240. The front plate was made of anodized aluminium instead of polycarbonate plastic, and "Signature iPod White" was replaced by silver. The sixth-generation iPod also introduced a completely overhauled user interface, incorporating more graphics and Cover Flow. The iPod Classic was offered in an 80 GB model for MSRP US$249 and a 160 GB model for MSRP US$349; this capacity distinguished it from the iPod Touch, which was limited to 32 GB.

The disks used in the 160 GB model, unlike any other iPod hard drive, employ a CE-ATA interface for which a different ribbon cable is used, and 4096-byte sectors are also used to work around the lack of LBA48 support in the Apple-supplied firmware.

Video playback specifications also received an upgrade over the previous generation, with further improvements to H.264 decoding (advertised up to 640 × 480p, baseline profile level 3.0, 2.5 Mbit/s bitrate; actual capabilities up to 720 × 576 at 5 Mbit/s with caveats) as well as supporting the Apple Component AV Cable with progressive scan, but removes support for cables without an authentication chip and those connecting to the headphone port.

==== 2008 revision ====
During the "Let's Rock" Apple Event on September 9, 2008, the 80 GB and the thicker 160 GB models were discontinued in favor of a thin 120 GB version retailing for US$249, and later US$229. It introduced Genius and full support for TRRS headsets with remote and mic, which are also available in other iPod models released at similar times; no firmware update provides either feature to the 2007 iPods. The black model's faceplate was also replaced with a space gray colored faceplate, while retaining the silver backing and the black Click Wheel.

==== 2009 revision ("7th generation") ====
During the "It's Only Rock and Roll" Apple Event on September 9, 2009, Apple replaced the 120 GB model with a new 160 GB model, featuring the same slim profile of the 80 GB and 120 GB models. It also introduced Genius Mixes and added support for 48-bit sector numbers, removing the LBA28 addressing limitation in the stock operating system that prevented it from reading more than 128 GB of storage without a specialized hard drive. It retailed at US$249.

This model is commonly referred to as the "7th generation" to distinguish it from prior revisions. Units of this revision in the European Union sold after 2013 include an option to disable the regional built-in volume limit.

== Discontinuation ==
According to speculation by Wired in 2013, the 6th generation was expected to be the final form of the iPod Classic. Ars Technica speculated in 2011 that the iPod Classic was nearing its end, and the site's readers generally agreed it would not still be produced in 2013. The Apple Worldwide Developers Conference in 2013 revealed no new iPod Classic, and Apple was not expected to produce another one. Production of the iPod Classic continued in low volumes as a stopgap measure to clear out and monetize inventory of unused stand-alone parts.

On September 9, 2014, Apple officially discontinued the iPod Classic. The sixth-generation 160 GB iPod Classic was the last Apple product in the iPod line to use the original 30-pin iPod connector and the Click Wheel. According to Tim Cook speaking at WSJD Live, the iPod Classic was discontinued because the parts were unavailable and a redesign was unwarranted given the small amount of consumer interest in the product.

== Modding scene ==
Long after its discontinuation, the iPod Classic continues to have significant ongoing appeal. While some of it is attributed to nostalgia, many prize the iPod Classic on a purely utilitarian basis due to its unique features and functionality, such as the click wheel, form factor and software, finding that the larger, touchscreen-only iPod Touch or a smartphone does not make an adequate substitute. Other continued iPod users dislike music streaming, preferring to not pay costly subscriptions, own their music, download tracks in high-resolution, and play it while offline. While Apple ignored the 20th anniversary of the iPod in 2021, a large modding scene has emerged to extend their operational lifespan and upgrade them with modern hardware, adding features such as Bluetooth capability and flash memory.

Modding of the iPod Classic is made possible by its modular design, making it easier for enthusiasts to disassemble. One of the most common mods is to replace the hard drive with solid-state memory, reducing the iPod's weight while increasing battery life, decreasing read time, and making it silent and less prone to damage from wear and tear or sudden shocks. Furthermore, this frees up space for additional hardware. Replacing the battery with a higher-capacity one and swapping the case is also common. Mods are performed by both individuals and businesses that center their business model around purchasing old iPods in bulk so they can upgrade and resell them at a profit.

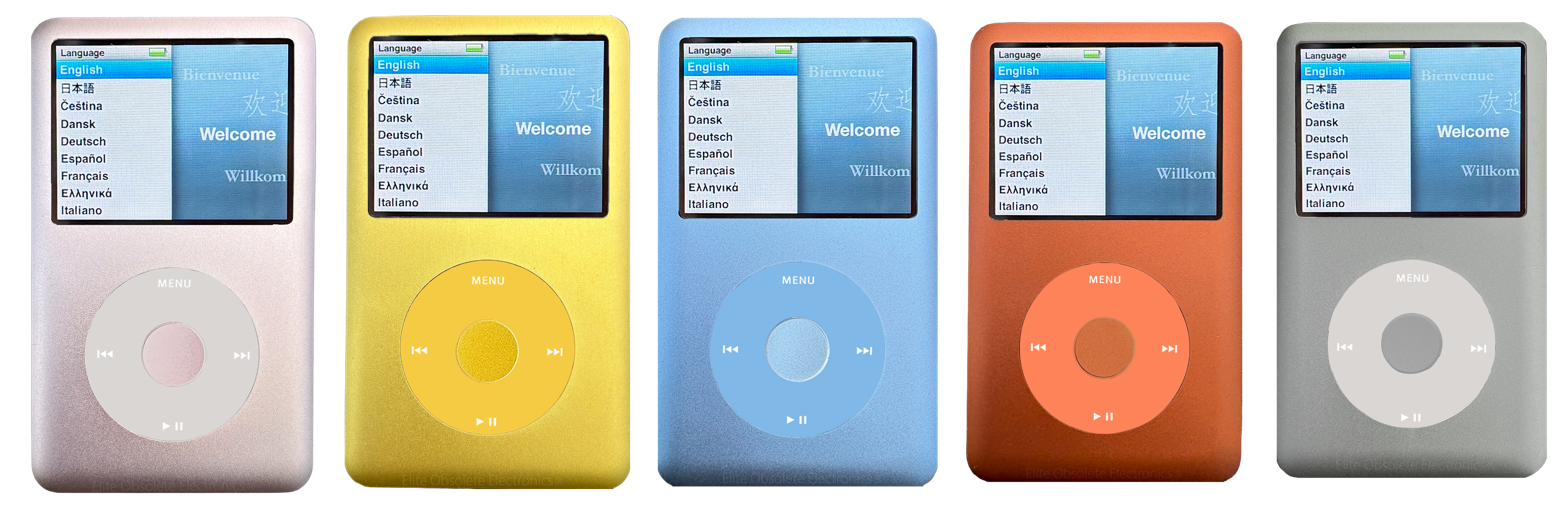
Examples of iPod Classic units with aftermarket parts installed.

iPod Classics cannot be used with modern wireless headphones without an adapter, leading to attempts to add Bluetooth to them. Amir Rees, an iPod modder, developed and began selling a self-contained iPod Bluetooth kit. Other more uncommon additions to the iPod enabled with modding include haptic feedback via the Taptic Engine, including a simulation of hard drive operation in an iPod equipped with solid-state memory, as well as adding custom firmware and an M.2 SSD.

Rockbox, a free and open-source operating system replacement for various media players, has an iPod port for all iPod classic models.

Some iPod models can be emulated in clicky using a copy of their internal hard drive and their internal firmware memory.

== Models ==
| Generation | Image | Capacity | Colors | Connection | Release date | Minimum OS to sync | Rated battery life (hours) |
|---|---|---|---|---|---|---|---|
| 1st | iPod (1st gen) | 5 GB | White | FireWire 400 | November 10, 2001 | Mac: 9.2.1, 10.1 | audio: 10 |
| 1st | iPod (1st gen) | 10 GB | White | FireWire 400 | March 21, 2002 | Mac: 9.2.1, 10.1 | audio: 10 |
| 1st | iPod (1st gen) | First model, with mechanical scroll wheel. 10 GB model released later. Not compatible with Windows. | | | | | |
| 1st (1st revision) | iPod (1st gen) | 5 GB | White | FireWire 400 | August 2002 | Mac: 9.2.2, 10.1.4; Win: 2000 | audio: 10 |
| 1st (1st revision) | iPod (1st gen) | 5 GB | White (Limited Edition Madonna); White (Limited Edition Tony Hawk); White (Limited Edition No Doubt); White (Limited Edition Beck) | FireWire 400 | December 10, 2002 | Mac: 9.2.2, 10.1.4; Win: 2000 | audio: 10 |
| 1st (1st revision) | iPod (1st gen) | Mechanical scroll wheel. Windows-compatible model available. Windows compatibility through Musicmatch. | | | | | |
| 2nd | iPod (2nd gen) | 10 GB | White | FireWire 400 | August 2002 | Mac: 9.2.2, 10.1.4; Win: 2000 | audio: 10 |
| 2nd | iPod (2nd gen) | 10 GB | White (Limited Edition Madonna); White (Limited Edition Tony Hawk); White (Limited Edition No Doubt); White (Limited Edition Beck) | FireWire 400 | December 10, 2002 | Mac: 9.2.2, 10.1.4; Win: 2000 | audio: 10 |
| 2nd | iPod (2nd gen) | 20 GB | White | FireWire 400 | August 2002 | Mac: 9.2.2, 10.1.4; Win: 2000 | audio: 10 |
| 2nd | iPod (2nd gen) | 20 GB | White (Limited Edition Madonna); White (Limited Edition Tony Hawk); White (Limited Edition No Doubt); White (Limited Edition Beck) | FireWire 400 | December 10, 2002 | Mac: 9.2.2, 10.1.4; Win: 2000 | audio: 10 |
| 2nd | iPod (2nd gen) | Touch-sensitive wheel. FireWire port had a cover. Hold switch revised. Windows-compatible models available. Windows compatibility through Musicmatch. | | | | | |
| 3rd | iPod (3rd gen) | 10 GB | White | FireWire via dock connector (USB for data transfer only — no charging) | May 2, 2003 | Mac: 10.1.5; Win: 2000 iTunes 4 or later Unofficially compatible with iTunes 2 and Mac OS 9 when using iPod Software 2.0.1 | audio: 8 |
| 3rd | iPod (3rd gen) | 15 GB | White | FireWire via dock connector (USB for data transfer only — no charging) | May 2, 2003 | Mac: 10.1.5; Win: 2000 iTunes 4 or later Unofficially compatible with iTunes 2 and Mac OS 9 when using iPod Software 2.0.1 | audio: 8 |
| 3rd | iPod (3rd gen) | 30 GB | White | FireWire via dock connector (USB for data transfer only — no charging) | May 2, 2003 | Mac: 10.1.5; Win: 2000 iTunes 4 or later Unofficially compatible with iTunes 2 and Mac OS 9 when using iPod Software 2.0.1 | audio: 8 |
| 3rd | iPod (3rd gen) | First complete redesign with all-touch interface, dock connector, and slimmer case. Musicmatch support dropped with later release of iTunes 4.1 for Windows. | | | | | |
| 3rd (1st revision) | iPod (3rd gen) | 10 GB | White | FireWire via dock connector (USB for data transfer only — no charging) | September 8, 2003 | Mac: 10.1.5; Win: 2000 iTunes 4 or later | audio: 8 |
| 3rd (1st revision) | iPod (3rd gen) | 20 GB | White | FireWire via dock connector (USB for data transfer only — no charging) | September 8, 2003 | Mac: 10.1.5; Win: 2000 iTunes 4 or later | audio: 8 |
| 3rd (1st revision) | iPod (3rd gen) | 40 GB | White | FireWire via dock connector (USB for data transfer only — no charging) | September 8, 2003 | Mac: 10.1.5; Win: 2000 iTunes 4 or later | audio: 8 |
| 3rd (2nd revision) | iPod (3rd gen) | 15 GB | White | FireWire via dock connector (USB for data transfer only — no charging) | January 6, 2004 | Mac: 10.1.5; Win: 2000 iTunes 4 or later | audio: 8 |
| 3rd (2nd revision) | iPod (3rd gen) | 20 GB | White | FireWire via dock connector (USB for data transfer only — no charging) | January 6, 2004 | Mac: 10.1.5; Win: 2000 iTunes 4 or later | audio: 8 |
| 3rd (2nd revision) | iPod (3rd gen) | 40 GB | White | FireWire via dock connector (USB for data transfer only — no charging) | January 6, 2004 | Mac: 10.1.5; Win: 2000 iTunes 4 or later | audio: 8 |
| 4th | iPod (4th gen) | 20 GB | White | FireWire or USB | July 19, 2004 | Mac: 10.1.5; Win: 2000 iTunes 4.6 or later | audio: 12 |
| 4th | iPod (4th gen) | 20 GB | Black/Red (Special Edition U2) | FireWire or USB | October 26, 2004 | Mac: 10.1.5; Win: 2000 iTunes 4.6 or later | audio: 12 |
| 4th | iPod (4th gen) | 40 GB | White | FireWire or USB | July 19, 2004 | Mac: 10.1.5; Win: 2000 iTunes 4.6 or later | audio: 12 |
| 4th | iPod (4th gen) | Adopted Click Wheel from iPod Mini; pack-in accessories reduced along with price drop. | | | | | |
| 4th / Photo | iPod (4th gen) | 40 GB | White | FireWire or USB | October 26, 2004 | Mac: 10.2.8; Win: 2000 iTunes 4.7 or later | audio: 15 slideshow: 5 |
| 4th / Photo | iPod (4th gen) | 60 GB | White | FireWire or USB | October 26, 2004 | Mac: 10.2.8; Win: 2000 iTunes 4.7 or later | audio: 15 slideshow: 5 |
| 4th / Photo | iPod (4th gen) | Premium spin-off of 4G iPod with color screen and picture viewing. | | | | | |
| 4th / Photo (1st revision) | iPod (4th gen) | 30 GB | White | FireWire or USB | February 23, 2005 | Mac: 10.2.8; Win: 2000 iTunes 4.7 or later | audio: 15 slideshow: 5 |
| 4th / Photo (1st revision) | iPod (4th gen) | 60 GB | White | FireWire or USB | February 23, 2005 | Mac: 10.2.8; Win: 2000 iTunes 4.7 or later | audio: 15 slideshow: 5 |
| 4th / Photo (1st revision) | iPod (4th gen) | Pack-ins and price reduced. Images directly viewable via optional iPod Camera Connector. | | | | | |
| 4th (with color display) | iPod (4th gen) | 20 GB | White; Black/Red (Special Edition U2) | FireWire or USB | June 28, 2005 | Mac: 10.2.8; Win: 2000 iTunes 4.7 or later | audio: 15 slideshow: 5 |
| 4th (with color display) | iPod (4th gen) | 20 GB | White (Special Edition Harry Potter) | FireWire or USB | September 7, 2005 | Mac: 10.2.8; Win: 2000 iTunes 4.7 or later | audio: 15 slideshow: 5 |
| 4th (with color display) | iPod (4th gen) | 60 GB | White | FireWire or USB | June 28, 2005 | Mac: 10.2.8; Win: 2000 iTunes 4.7 or later | audio: 15 slideshow: 5 |
| 4th (with color display) | iPod (4th gen) | "iPod with color display"; essentially, the iPod Photo model reintegrated with the main iPod lineup. | | | | | |
| 5th / Video | iPod (5th gen) | 30 GB | White; Black; White (Special Edition Harry Potter) | USB (FireWire for charging only) | October 2005 | Mac: 10.3.9; Win: 2000 iTunes 6 or later | audio: 14 slideshow: 3 video: 2 |
| 5th / Video | iPod (5th gen) | 30 GB | Black/Red (Special Edition U2) | USB (FireWire for charging only) | June 6, 2006 | Mac: 10.3.9; Win: 2000 iTunes 6 or later | audio: 14 slideshow: 3 video: 2 |
| 5th / Video | iPod (5th gen) | 60 GB | White; Black | USB (FireWire for charging only) | October 2005 | Mac: 10.3.9; Win: 2000 iTunes 6 or later | audio: 20 slideshow: 4 video: 3 |
| 5th / Video | iPod (5th gen) | Second full redesign with a slimmer case, and larger screen with video playback. Offered in black or white. | | | | | |
| 5th (1st revision) | iPod (5th gen) | 30 GB | White; Black; Black/Red (Special Edition U2) | USB (FireWire for charging only) | September 12, 2006 | Mac: 10.3.9; Win: 2000 iTunes 7 or later | audio: 14 slideshow: 4 video: 3.5 |
| 5th (1st revision) | iPod (5th gen) | 80 GB | White; Black | USB (FireWire for charging only) | September 12, 2006 | Mac: 10.3.9; Win: 2000 iTunes 7 or later | audio: 20 slideshow: 6 video: 6.5 |
| 5th (1st revision) | iPod (5th gen) | Battery life improved for slideshow and video playbacks as well as a very slight change in software giving the user the "search" ability. | | | | | |
| 6th (Classic) | iPod (6th gen) | 80 GB | Silver; Black (black front plate and black wheel) | USB (FireWire for charging only) | September 5, 2007 | Mac: 10.4.8; Win: XP SP2 | audio: 30 video: 5 |
| 6th (Classic) | iPod (6th gen) | 160 GB | Silver; Black (black front plate and black wheel) | USB (FireWire for charging only) | September 5, 2007 | Mac: 10.4.8; Win: XP SP2 | audio: 40 video: 7 |
| 6th (Classic) | iPod (6th gen) | Introduced the "Classic" suffix. New interface and anodized aluminum front plate. Silver replaces white. | | | | | |
| 6th (Classic) (1st revision) | iPod (6th gen) | 120 GB | Silver; Black (gray front plate and black wheel) | USB (FireWire for charging only) | September 9, 2008 | Mac: 10.4.11; Win: XP SP3 | audio: 36 video: 6 |
| 6th (Classic) (1st revision) | iPod (6th gen) | Genius feature added. 160GB model dropped and 80GB model upgraded to 120 GB. Can use mic and remote controller through 3.5mm audio jack. Front plate color changed (Black to Gray). | | | | | |
| 6th (Classic) (2nd revision) | iPod (6th gen) | 160 GB | Silver; Black (gray front plate and black wheel) | USB (FireWire for charging only) | September 9, 2009 | Mac: 10.4.11; Win: XP SP3 | audio: 36 video: 6 |
| 6th (Classic) (2nd revision) | iPod (6th gen) | Capacity increased to 160 GB using single-platter drive. Added Genius Mixes (after Software Update). Discontinued without replacement September 9, 2014. | | | | | |

== Timeline of full-size iPod models ==
Sources: Apple press release library, Mactracker Apple Inc. model database
