= Lost: Via Domus =

2008 video game

- Developer: Ubisoft Montreal
- Publisher: Ubisoft
- Producer: Gadi Pollack
- Designer: Adrien Banet-Rivet
- Programmer: Alex Parlour
- Artist: Wilson Mui
- Writers: Kevin Shortt; Damon Lindelof; Carlton Cuse
- Composer: Michael Giacchino
- Platforms: Microsoft Windows, PlayStation 3, Xbox 360
- Release: US: February 26, 2008; CAN: February 28, 2008; EU: February 28, 2008; AU: February 29, 2008
- Genre: Action-adventure
- Mode: Single-player

Lost: Via Domus, (Note: Means Lost: The Way Home) marketed as Lost: The Video Game in Europe, is a video game based on the ABC television series Lost. The game was released for the Microsoft Windows operating system, and the Xbox 360 and PlayStation 3 video game consoles in February 2008, after the third season of the series. In Via Domus, players control Elliott Maslow, a survivor of the plane crash that Lost revolves around. Although Elliott is not featured in the television series, the game contains many characters from the show, as well as many locations from Lost's mysterious island. Some of the original cast of the series provided the voices for their characters, and the Lost composer Michael Giacchino created the score for the game.

== Plot ==
The game is split up into seven "episodes". Each episode was plotted by the show's executive producers, Damon Lindelof and Carlton Cuse. The game's timeline coincides with the first 70 days portrayed in the television series.

=== Episode I – Force Majeure (Day 1) ===
Elliott Maslow wakes up on the Island after the crash of Flight 815 and starts to explore the jungle. He finds an unlucky passenger of Oceanic Flight 815 dead caught in some branches, and a mysterious woman standing beside the body. Elliott has flashes about a dead body and the woman's face. She disappears and reappears nearby.

Elliott follows her until he meets Kate. They have a brief conversation and when Kate gives him a bottle of water, Elliot has a flashback to when he is on the plane and sees the marshal and Kate in handcuffs, realizing that Kate was a fugitive, but promising to keep her secret. Elliott follows Walt's yellow Labrador, Vincent, to the crash site. Jack, who is seen trying to revive a man, tells Elliott to shut off the fuselage so that the engines do not explode. Later, Elliott tells Jack he cannot remember anything, which Jack diagnoses as amnesia. Jack recommends that he try to find any of his belongings. Kate tells him she found a backpack where they met and left it near the end of camp. Elliott gets attacked by a mysterious man, known as "Beady Eyes", who demands to know where the camera is and threatens to kill Elliott.

=== Episode II – A New Day (Day 2) ===
Elliott wakes up the next day and sees Jack, Kate and Charlie running from the Monster. Elliott talks to Kate about why Jack is guarding the only entrance to the jungle, and she tells him that Jack does not want anyone in the jungle after the encounter from the Monster. Elliott remembers to go to the cockpit when the flight attendant stowed away his camera. He thinks that the camera might restart his memory. Elliott sees the woman again at the edge of the beach. Elliott has a flashback to vacation in Thailand when the woman expresses her desire to explore a nearby island and tells a lie to steal a boat. He and the woman seem to be in a relationship. In the present, Elliott goes to Jack and tells a lie that Claire has fainted, and while Jack rushes to her, Elliott uses the opportunity to go to the cockpit. On the way, he is stopped by Locke who is hiding in some banyan trees. Elliot leaves Locke in the banyan trees and avoids the Monster on his way to the cockpit by hiding in the banyan trees that Locke told him about earlier. Eventually, he finds his laptop and camera, but on the way out is knocked out by Ben, Juliet and Tom.

=== Episode III – Via Domus (Days 17–21) ===
Back at the beach, Hurley tells Elliott that the other survivors do not trust him. Sayid tells him that Locke found some batteries in the wreckage and that Elliott should go talk to him, so that he may start up his laptop. Locke tells him he does not need his laptop because the Island is a fresh start, but this triggers a memory of Elliott in a thrift shop in Sydney, spying on Lisa Gellhorn, the woman he's been seeing on the Island, who is seeking information from Rico, the store owner. Elliott sees Locke, still in his wheelchair, trying to sell the camping equipment from his failed Walkabout. Locke decides to help Elliott find his batteries, but only if he is able to pass through the jungle and caves unharmed by the Monster or the Others. Elliott comes upon Locke's excavation of the Hatch, and visions of Lisa lead him safely through the caves. Elliott finds a corpse in the caves, holding a golden compass with the words Via Domus (Latin for "The Way Home") inscribed on it. Locke gives him the battery, saying "the Island provides", and believes that the Island gave Elliott the compass so that he may find the answers he is looking for.

=== Episode V – Hotel Persephone (Day 46) ===
Elliott wakes up in the armory and has another vision of Lisa, which prompts a flashback to the lobby of the Hotel Persephone in Sydney, the night of the Savo exchange. Beady Eyes checks for messages at the front desk for Savo's room, 42, and Elliott confronts Lisa, who claims that Savo is responsible for the death of her sister. They decide to expose Savo together, and Lisa distracts his guards so Elliott can sneak upstairs. Back in the Swan, Elliott uses his new-found memory of his job as a journalist to convince Kate to release him. Elliott discovers ultraviolet maps of the Island hidden around the hatch that point him to the entrance to the concrete room, hidden behind a waterfall outside the Swan. The door is sealed shut, but Hurley tells him about the dynamite they used to blow the hatch, hidden at the Black Rock deep in the jungle. The Monster chases Elliott through the Dark Territory and eventually comes upon the Black Rock, an old ship in the middle of the jungle. He retrieves the dynamite and, after evading the Others and the Monster, successfully blows open the door to the Incident Room. The room contains a large malfunctioning reactor, which interferes with his compass, Elliott uses a computer to neutralize the reactor, which fixes the compass. A beeping noise from the computer draws Elliott back, and on the screen is written "Elliott Maslow. We know what you did. And we will find you."

=== Episode VI – Whatever It Takes (Day 46) ===
Elliott is following his compass in the jungle when the Monster begins to chase him. When Elliott reaches the edge of the Others' sonic fence, the Monster confronts Elliott directly but lets him live and disappears into the jungle. Juliet appears and warns him not to cross the fence. Juliet tells Elliott that he is responsible for Lisa's death, prompting another flashback to the Persephone lobby. Lisa approaches Savo's guards at the elevator but is unable to distract him. Elliott tells the guard that Lisa is a journalist, hinting that she knows about Savo. The guard grabs Lisa, and Elliott takes the elevator to room 42. Back at the fence, Juliet lets Elliott through, saying that Ben wants him for some unknown purpose, and allows him access to the tunnels that lead him through the basement of the Flame station. Upon climbing the ladder to the main floor, Elliott finds Beady Eyes holding Mikhail hostage, but Elliott shoots and kills him. Mikhail thanks him and apologizes, as a dart strikes Elliott's neck and he falls to the ground.

=== Episode VII – Worth a Thousand Words (Day 67) ===
Elliott wakes up in a holding tank in the Hydra station, to another vision of Lisa. Tom asks him about Hanso and Lisa, which triggers another flashback to the night of the Savo deal. Elliott hides in Savo's room and witnesses Thomas Mittelwerk, President of the Hanso Foundation, giving Savo a briefcase containing sarin gas, which Savo intends to use to research ESP. Beady Eyes brings in Lisa. In the tank, Elliott realizes that he betrayed Lisa, and Tom lets him go. Elliott enters the Advisory Room, where Ben tells him that his compass will lead him to a boat that will take him off the island. But first, Elliot must lead Jack to the Black Rock, where Tom will be waiting for them. Elliot returns to the beach camp and tells Jack that he has found a way off the Island and to meet him at the Black Rock. At the ship, Jack hands Elliott a gun, and Tom and another step out with Kate as their hostage. Tom tells Elliott he can go, giving him his compass back. This triggers the final flashback scene, as Savo interrogates Lisa as to what she knows and the whereabouts of Elliott. Savo shoots her in the head as Elliott, still hiding, snaps a picture of the murder. Elliott runs and realizes he sacrificed Lisa for the sake of a single photo. Elliott shoots the dynamite on the ship, incapacitating the Others and allowing Kate and Jack to escape, but leaving Elliott unconscious. Jack decides to leave him there, despite Kate's objections. Elliott is awakened by Juliet, who tells him that Ben has ordered him killed and his boat destroyed. She tells him to follow a bearing of 325 to get home, and that he has to hurry to the boat before the Others get there. He arrives in time at the dock and is surprised to find Locke there. Locke fends off the Others and tells Elliott that he wants to stay on the Island. Elliott boards the sailboat, named the 'Via Domus' and sails away from the Island. As he does so, he picks up a mayday transmission on the radio and the sky begins to shake, making the same noise as the day of the implosion of the Swan station. Elliott looks up to see a plane breaking apart and crashing on the Island. Elliott wakes up again on the day of the crash, only to be confronted by a very much alive Lisa Gellhorn, who exclaims "Oh my God, we made it. We're alive".

== Gameplay ==
The player is cast as a previously unseen survivor, Elliott Maslow, a photojournalist with amnesia. Gameplay involves Resident Evil-style fetch quests and puzzle solving. The use of flashbacks as a storytelling device, which is integral to the television show, is part of the gameplay. Also, owing to the main character's amnesia, they are often just as revealing to the character as they are to the player. The player explores locations seen in the show, such as the beach camp, the dark territory, The Pearl Station, The Hydra Station, the Flame station, the Black Rock and the Swan Station.

The player also interacts with some of the major characters of the television show; Sawyer, Jack, Sun, Kate, Ben, Juliet, and Locke, among others. Elliott must also avoid the "Black Smoke" monster. Trading with other survivors and taking photos with a camera is also part of the gameplay.

== Development ==
On May 22, 2006, Ubisoft announced that they had licensed the rights from Touchstone Television to create a video game based on Lost planned for release at the end of February 2008.

Although it was not in development hell, there had been no updates on the game since its initial May 2006 announcement when Damon Lindelof and Carlton Cuse stated in the official Lost podcast of April 16, 2007, that the game was in production and that they had seen playable footage of the game. The game was officially unveiled at Comic-Con 2007.

== Reception ==
Reception

Aggregate score
Aggregator	Score
Metacritic	PC: 52/100; PS3: 54/100; X360: 55/100

Review scores
Publication	Score
1Up.com	C-
G4	2/5
Game Informer	6.75/10
GamePro	2.75/5
GameSpot	6.5/10
GameSpy	2/5
GameTrailers	5.2/10
IGN	5.5/10
PlayStation Official Magazine – UK	5.10
Official U.S. PlayStation Magazine	5/10
Official Xbox Magazine (US)	4.0/10
PC PowerPlay	5/10
Play	38/100
PSM3	42/100

Lost: Via Domus received mixed reviews from critics. Based on 50 reviews, the Xbox 360 version holds a score of 55 out of 100 at Metacritic.

Critics believed the game is most enjoyable to die-hard Lost fans, with 1Up.com commenting that "Via Domus is fan service through and through". They also believed that the game was short, with IGN citing completion in 4 to 6 hours, and GameSpot claiming that it is too short to justify full price. Several reviews also criticized the stand-in voice actors. For example, IGN claimed Locke was played like an "old-timey prospector", while Sawyer sounded like "Huckleberry Hound".

However, Eurogamer believed that the game did a good job of "creating a new character [that is] able to exist without disrupting the [series'] timeline or feeling like an aberration", and the game's graphics and presentation received praise. Ultimately, IGN summarized that Via Domus "is a game for the fans, which only fans can appreciate. But at the same time - in a strange bit of paradox - this is a game that will disappoint almost every Lost fan."
