= Cubis 2 =

2004 video game

- Developer: FreshGames
- Publisher: FreshGames
- Designer: Steve Meretzky
- Platforms: Windows, Apple iPod, J2ME
- Release: November 12, 2004
- Genres: Puzzle, Strategy
- Mode: Single-player

Cubis 2 is a puzzle video game released in 2004 by FreshGames. In Cubis 2, the player shoots different colored cubes into cubes already placed on the isometric game table. Once three of the same color are matched in a row or are stacked, the cubes disappear and the player earns points. Once the board is clear or enough points are earned, the player advances to the next board which features a new animated backdrop.

== Cubis game series ==
In 2002 the game Cubis was released in a Java version playable in web browsers. It was later updated into a Flash version. In 2003 a deluxe version of Cubis was released online for Windows PCs titled Cubis Gold. In 2004, a sequel to Cubis was released titled Cubis 2. The sequel was more successful and got a boxed PC version from MumboJumbo, and a Flash demo was also released for web browsers. The Flash demo was once available on the GSN website, but it has since been removed. Cubis 2 was also released on phones in a Java version. In 2020 an HTML5 version of Cubis 2 with updated graphics was made for MSN Games. In 2005 an online slot machine based on Cubis 2 was released by Wagerlogic called Cubis Slots, which was a version of Cubis 2 where the player could win money. Cubis Slots has since been taken down.

In September 2006 Apple Inc. announced that Cubis 2 would be one of the first games to release for the Apple iPod. On August 29, 2007, FreshGames released the Cubis Level Packs which added 100 new levels to Cubis 2.

In 2013, another sequel to Cubis was released on the PC titled Cubis Creatures. Although the gameplay is similar to the first two Cubis games, the levels are now made to look like various creatures. In 2017, yet another sequel to Cubis was released on the PC titled Cubis Kingdoms. The gameplay is similar to the previous Cubis games, but town-building game mechanics have been added and there are now bosses in the game. Cubis Gold, Cubis Creatures, and Cubis Kingdoms are all included on the boxed PC compilation Amazing Match 3 Games: Magical Matches, which was released by Legacy Games in 2018.

== Reception ==
- Lookie.DE – 82%
- Handydownloads – 86%
- PocketGamer – Bronze Award
- Top 10 Game of 2004 from Shockwave.com
