= CE-ATA =

Interface for small hard drives

Consumer Electronics ATA (CE-ATA) is an interface standard for the connection of storage devices and hosts in consumer electronic device such as mobile and handheld devices. One of the primary goals is to standardize connections for small form factor hard disk drives such as 1-inch Microdrives.

The standard is maintained by the CE-ATA Workgroup.

== History ==
The CE-ATA Specification was developed in 2005.

== Interface ==
=== MMC ===
CE-ATA is electrically and physically compatible with MMC specification. CE-ATA uses MMC connector on host devices and matching flex cable or circuit connection on CE-ATA hard disk drives.

=== Pin Assignment ===
Pin #	Signal - x4 Data Lines	Signal - x8 Data Lines
1	Vss	Vss
2	DAT2	DAT2
3	DAT3	DAT3
4	Supply Voltage	Vss
5	CMD	DAT4
6	Interface Voltage	DAT5
7	CLK	Supply Voltage
8	Vss	CMD
9	DAT0	Interface Voltage
10	DAT1	CLK
11	Vss	Vss
12	Reserved	DAT6
13	(Not Used)	DAT7
14	(Not Used)	Vss
15	(Not Used)	DAT0
16	(Not Used)	DAT1
17	(Not Used)	Vss
18	(Not Used)	Reserved

== See also ==
- AT Attachment (ATA)
- MMC
