= Block Breaker Deluxe =

2004 video game

- Developer: Gameloft Romania
- Platforms: Java 2 ME, iPod, iPhone OS, N-Gage, Microsoft Windows, Wii, Nintendo DSi
- Release: Mobile phone 2004 iPod; January 2008; Wii: JP: May 7, 2008; NA: June 16, 2008; EU: June 20, 2008; DS: NA: June 24, 2008
- Genre: Breakout clone
- Modes: Single-player, multiplayer

Block Breaker Deluxe is a video game developed by Gameloft Romania for mobile phones. It was also released for iPod, Windows PCs, the N-Gage platform, the Nintendo DS as part of the Midnight Play Pack collection, and the Wii as a WiiWare game. Gameloft claims it is the best selling arcade wall breaking game on mobile platforms, with over 8 million copies sold.

A sequel, Block Breaker Deluxe 2, was later released for mobile phones and the iPhone OS. A third game, Block Breaker 3: Unlimited was also released, in 2012. The third installment is currently playable for free on Gameloft's online gaming platform, Ludigames.

== Gameplay ==
The game is a Breakout clone with an urban nightclub or casino themed setting with the object of the game being for the player to break as many blocks as they can without causing the ball to fall. As they progress through different levels, power-ups become available to the player to aid them.

The player will progress through a map which shows different locations that contain a set of levels. Each set has 10 levels with a boss battle at the end. Initially, only one location is available at the start and more can be unlocked by finishing the level sets sequentially. Every location has its own character that acts as an in-game tutor who give tips and tricks during gameplay. Optionally, the player can purchase an unlockable location which offers an endless, randomly-generated levels.

Each level contain a special "gift" power-up, which can be used to gain reputation at the specific location.

There are seven different locations, with one of them are a special randomly-generated level.

== Sequels ==
The game had a few different versions, which were only on mobile: Block Breaker Deluxe, which is the standard version and called Block Breaker Midnight Challenge Deluxe on PC, Block Breaker Valentine, which is themed around Valentine's Day, Block Breaker Christmas, which is themed around Christmas, and Block Breaker Holidays, which is similar to Block Breaker Christmas, except it only has 3 levels and when you finish it tells you to get Block Breaker Deluxe. It also got 2 sequels: Block Breaker 2 Live Deluxe, which is sometimes just called Block Breaker 2 Deluxe, and Block Breaker 3 Unlimited, which is called Block Breaker 3 Free+ on iPhones.
