= Coolgorilla =

Software developer

Coolgorilla was one of the earliest software developers that created third-party native applications for Apple iPod devices. Coolgorilla was an early adopter of using a sponsorship business model to enable mobile applications to be given away freely.

Coolgorilla developed a series of Talking Phrasebooks for iPods in 2006. They partnered with online travel company lastminute.com who sponsored the applications enabling them to be made available to download completely free of charge. As mobile devices became more sophisticated, Coolgorilla developed the Talking Phrasebooks for Sony Ericsson and Nokia Mobile Devices which at the time were considerably noteworthy since the applications used real voice audio translations.

With Apple's introduction of the iPhone in 2007, Coolgorilla developed a Web App before having four of the iPhone Talking Phrasebooks available to download from Apple's App Store on the day it opened in 2008.

== Almanac in Chronological Order ==
On 23 December 2005, CoolGorilla, a new start-up, launched a trivia game for the iPod; it was titled Rock and Pop Quiz. It was a quiz game that tested users' knowledge on artists such as U2, Metallica, Beyoncé, and the Beatles. The quiz contained twenty megabytes of audible trivia questions. The free game was compatible with 3rd-, 4th- and 5th-generation iPods, iPod Mini, and iPod Nano.

In March 2006, Coolgorilla released Movie Quiz for iPods with a price of $5. It was an audio game narrated by New York's DJ Thomas, a radio and television host, voice-over artist and event master of ceremonies. There were questions on Star Wars, Spider-Man, The Godfather, Pulp Fiction, The Matrix, James Bond, and others. The user could keep track of their score. The game included a secret code for players who answered all questions correctly which enabled users to enter their name on the Coolgorilla Hall of Fame.

In May 2006, Coolgorilla launched a World Cup Encyclopedia which was released prior to the 2006 FIFA World Cup. It had information on the World Cup schedule, details of every player from every team, every score from every world cup game ever played, stadium details, and manager profiles. It was a free download.

In June 2006, Coolgorilla released a series of iPod Phrasebooks in German, Greek, French and Spanish. They were sponsored by lastminute.com and were free. The phrasebooks included common words and phrases for tourists with 750 sound files. They were accessed through the iPod's Notes feature.

In April 2007, Coolgorilla released a downloadable version of the Talking Phrasebooks for Nokia and Sony Ericsson mobile devices. French, Spanish, German, Greek, Italian, and Portuguese were produced. The application provided real voice translations. They initially sold for £3 but 3 months later were offered for free. The branding was lastminute.com branding.

Apple's iPhone was released at the end of June 2007. Soon after, Coolgorilla released an online all-in-one version of their Talking Phrasebooks for iPhone (Web App). The Phrasebooks were made available online in the form of a web app as iPhone did not yet allow for the download of additional apps. The app provided both text and audio translations in French, Spanish, Portuguese, Italian, German, and Greek. The iPhone translated the phrases using the recordings of real, native voice-over artists. A text translation on screen was also displayed.

Apple's App Store opened in July 2008 with approximately 500 native apps available. Four of these Apps were Coolgorilla's Talking Phrasebooks for iPhone (Native Apps). There was French, German, Italian, and Spanish. These Apps carried lastminute.com branding and were available for free download.

In the first three weeks following their release, the phrasebooks had over 350,000 downloads. Subsequently, Dutch, Arabic, Mandarin and Cantonese were also released.

In October 2008, Coolgorilla released an iPhone London Travel Guide.

Coolgorilla featured on NBC News in August 2009.

In 2010, FIAT used the Italian Phrasebook to help promote the release of their FIAT 500 in the US.

There has been no further activity since.
