= Adidas miCoach =

Former Adidas fitness company

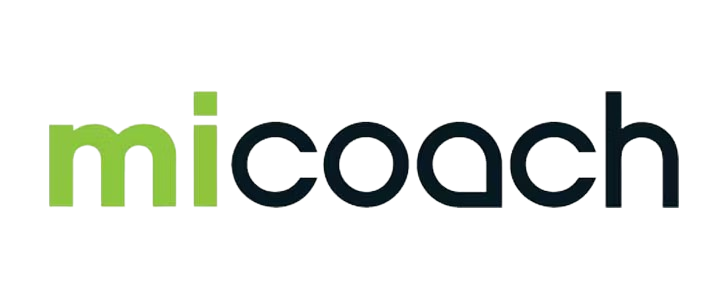
- Company type: Subsidiary
- Industry: Health; Fitness
- Founded: January 7, 2010; 16 years ago
- Defunct: February 28, 2018
- Successor: Adidas Runtastic
- Parent: Adidas

Adidas miCoach (stylized as adidas miCoach) was an Adidas subsidiary which was first announced as a pacer and smart watch on January 7 at the 2010 International Consumer Electronics Show.

Adidas miCoach was the parent of many products, including a video game, a fitness app, a pacer, a smart watch, and a performance center at the Ajax Youth Academy.

== Video game ==
Adidas miCoach
- Xbox 360 version's Australian cover art
- Developer: Chromativity (formerly Lightning Fish Games)
- Publisher: 505 Games
- Platforms: Xbox 360; PlayStation 3
- Release: EU: July 13, 2012; NA: July 24, 2012; AU: July 26, 2012
- Genres: Fitness; Sports; Simulation
- Mode: Single-player

Adidas miCoach is a fitness/sports simulation game developed by Lightning Fish Games and Chromativity and published by 505 Games. It was released on July 13, 2012, in Europe, July 24, 2012, in North America, and July 26, 2012, in Australia for the Xbox 360 via Kinect and PlayStation 3 via PlayStation Move.

=== Gameplay ===
Adidas miCoach brought the miCoach interactive athletic training system to video game consoles. Players received real-time feedback on their actual in-game performance during their workouts when wearing a miCoach heart rate monitor.

Instead of faceless narrators or anonymous characters, Adidas miCoach makes use of digitized video footage of actual star athletes, such as Dwight Howard and Ana Ivanovic.

Adidas miCoach offers fitness training for specific sports across six disciplines. Users can train in basketball, association football, American football, tennis, running and rugby. There are also general fitness plans for both men and women.

=== Reception ===
Adidas miCoach received "mixed or average" reviews, according to review aggregator Metacritic.

Reception

Aggregate score
Aggregator	Score	
Aggregator	PS3	Xbox 360
Metacritic	35/100	54/100

Review score
Publication	Score	
Publication	PS3	Xbox 360
Eurogamer	N/A	4/10

Liam Martin on Digital Spy rated the game 3/5. Also stated that "Adidas miCoach lacks a little finesse, making it hard to recommend above superior fitness titles such as UFC Personal Trainer."

Ravi Sinha on GamingBolt rated the game 5/10 for the Xbox 360. Also stated that "Adidas miCoach isn’t fun, it isn’t responsive and while it means well with it's [sic] excessive content and features, it just doesn’t measure up to Kinect fitness game standards."

Play Sense rated the PlayStation 3 version of the game 3.5/10, stating that "The game uses the PlayStation Move and after calibrating, you would expect it to work well. However, the registration is pretty worthless." Also stating that "In conclusion, Adidas miCoach is a failure on almost every level."

== Fitness app ==
adidas miCoach
- Initial release: March 2014
- Operating system: iOS; Android; Windows
- Successor: Adidas Runtastic
- Type: Health care
- Website: Official website

The adidas miCoach app was a free fitness app that provides real-time audible training and sports-specific training programs. It was available for iOS, Android, and Windows.

The user could customize the app with the voice of an adidas athlete of their choice, such as David Villa.

The app could track the user's exercise and act as a personal trainer. It also provided GPS tracking, though pace and speed were calculated guesses without GPS. The app worked similarly to Nike+.

=== Discontinuation ===
In February 2017, Adidas announced it was discontinuing the miCoach platform. On February 28, 2018, it shut down the platform and passed the torch to Runtastic, but users were allowed migrate to Runtastic and get a free Premium membership. Adidas set up a transition service for miCoach users to migrate to Runtastic. Users could link their miCoach account to Runtastic and sync their workout data. All miCoach data from users was anonymized within Adidas systems and is no longer accessible (unless users had migrated to Runtastic). Data migration from the miCoach platform to the Adidas Running app is no longer feasible.

In September 2019, Runtastic rebranded its "Runtastic" app to "Adidas Running" and its "Results" app to "Adidas Training".

== Smart watch ==
Adidas miCoach Smart Run Watch

The Adidas miCoach Smart Run watch was announced on January 7, 2010, at the 2010 International Consumer Electronics Show and was released on in mid-August 2014 in North America, on August 15, 2014, worldwide.

The game and app were compatible with the discontinued Adidas miCoach Smart Run watch. The Adidas miCoach Smart Run was the sports company's first entry into the smartwatch market and is supposed to feel like a personal coach on your wrist than a simple activity tracker. The Smart Run is a stand-alone device and cannot be used with Adidas Running. It only worked with the Adidas miCoach app.

Specifications
Type	Name
Software	Android Jelly Bean 4.1.1
Dimensions	48.4 x 15.6 x 263.1mm

The miCoach replaced the need for a chest-mounted heart rate monitor, building it in directly beneath the watch, and also came with GPS and Bluetooth for an all-in-one running gadget. The company priced it at $199 and released in mid-August 2014 in the North America, and for the rest of the world on August 15, 2014, through Adidas' website, and on September 1 through Adidas Sports Performance stores.

Richard Trenholm on CNET stated that "Adidas's new high-tech timepiece does a lot more than the new Nike FuelBand SE. The FuelBand is a bracelet that records your activity and converts your exertions into NikeFuel points on the Nike+ website, but fitness fanatics are disappointed (as) the new bracelet doesn't feature a heart rate monitor. Still, its substantially cheaper than the Smart Run."

== See also ==
- Adidas
