= Allsport GPS =

Defunct fitness tracking application

Allsport GPS was a fitness tracking phone application combined with a website. As of March 2016, it was discontinued and services were shut down.

It uses GPS to provide performance statistics and is run on a GPS-enabled cell phone. The GPS gives Allsport GPS a precise way of measuring statistics such as pace, speed, time and distance. Users can view their route overlaid on a map. The application is used for fitness training regimes and goal tracking. The workout information uploads to the Allsport GPS website wirelessly. In 2006 Allsport GPS introduced the ability to view workouts in the Trimble Outdoors Google Earth layer.

== History ==
Allsport GPS is a part of the Trimble Outdoors product family. It is owned by Trimble Navigation which was founded in 1978. The Allsport GPS application was bought by Trimble in April 2006. The software continues to be updated periodically. Allsport GPS started out as only available on limited phone models and carriers, but this list has steadily been expanding since then. In 2007 Allsport GPS was released on Blackberry phones. Allsport GPS was released on AT&T phones in 2008.

== Functions ==
The purpose of Allsport GPS is to support fitness and performance tracking. It is part of a trio of cell phone applications called Trimble Outdoors. It can be used for workouts such as running, jogging, mountain biking, road biking, and walking. The application is downloaded onto a GPS cell phone. The user then straps the phone onto themselves or onto their bike, or holds the phone for the duration of their workout. During the workout Allsport GPS supplies real time statistics such as calories burned, time, speed and distance. These statistics are updated every ten seconds.

After the workout, the data is automatically uploaded wirelessly to the website. The data can then be viewed, a trip calendar showing all workouts over time, and elevation and speed profiles. On the Allsport map function, the workout can be viewed on a map both on the phone and on the website. The route can be made public and shared with others. The user can do a trip search on the website and view other users' shared workouts as well as workouts from Bicycling Magazine. These routes can be downloaded from the website. The phone application has a race-against-yourself feature that enables the user to compare their times and distances multiple times over the same track.

== Reviews ==
Allsport GPS has been mentioned in print and internet publications such as Men’s Health Magazine and The New York Times Online. In 2007 it was named GPS Gadget of the Week by GeoCarta. Both Fred Zahradnik from About.com GPS and Laptop Magazine gave Allsport GPS 4/5 stars in 2007.

== Related software, social platforms and mobile apps ==
- Runtastic
- Endomondo
