= Too Good To Go =

Mobile application

- Type: Private
- Industry: Mobile app
- Founded: 2015 in Denmark
- Founders: Thomas Bjørn Momsen, Stian Michael Hånes Olesen, Klaus Bagge Pedersen, Adam Papalia Sigbrand.
- Headquarters: Copenhagen, Denmark
- Areas served: Europe, North America, Australia and New Zealand.
- Key people: Brian Christensen, Sophie Wiik, Lucie Basch, Jamie Crummie, Mette Lykke (CEO)
- Number of employees: 262 (2024)
- Website: toogoodtogo.org/en

Too Good To Go is a service with a mobile application that connects customers to restaurants and stores that have surplus unsold food. The service covers major European cities, and in October 2020 started operations in North America. As part of the initiatives taken on the International Day of Awareness of Food Loss and Waste to reduce food loss and waste, the app is suggested alongside OLIO among many others.

In 2023, Too Good To Go was the fastest-growing sustainable food app startup by number of downloads. As of August 2023, it claimed 164,000 businesses, serving 62 million users, have saved 155 million bags of food. As of March 2023, it claimed to have saved over 200 million meals

== History ==
The company was created in 2015 in Denmark by Thomas Bjørn Momsen, Klaus Bagge Pedersen, Stian Michael Hånes Olesen, Adam Sigbrand and Brian Christensen. In 2017, Mette Lykke (co-founder of Endomondo) joined as CEO.

In February 2019, the company raised an additional 6 million euros in a new round of investment. In August 2019, Too Good To Go was re-launched in Austria. In September 2019, Too Good To Go acquired the Spanish startup weSAVEeat and merged it into its own brand. In November 2019, the offer of Too Good To Go extended to plants through a partnership with the French retail plants company Jardiland. In December 2019, Too Good To Go partnered with the French grocery retail stores Intermarché, and donated 60K euros to the French charity Restaurants du Cœur. In October 2021, Bonnie Wright teamed up with Too Good To Go to drive the initiative to reduce food waste.

== Corporate affairs ==
The key trends for the Danish entity Too Good To Go ApS are (as of the financial year ending December 31):

	Revenue (DKK m)	Net profit (DKK m)	Total assets (DKK m)	Number of employees (Note: on average)	References
2017		−20.5	26.8		
2018	53.6	−29.7	47.6		
2019	170	−48.5	118		
2020	259	−144	239	171	
2021	449	−347	279	186	
2022 (Note: During 2022 the invoicing model was changed from most European markets being invoiced from Too Good To Go ApS to being invoiced from the Too Good To Go entity in the respective markets.)	496	−175	275	216	
2023	544	15.7	516	196	
2024	725	9.6	588	262	

== International expansion ==
Countries in which Too Good To Go operates as of March 2026

As of March 2026 the company serves the European countries Austria, Belgium, Czechia, Denmark, the Faroe Islands, France, Germany, Ireland, Italy, the Netherlands, Norway, Poland, Portugal, Spain, Sweden, Switzerland, the United Kingdom. Outside of Europe the service is available in Australia, Canada, Japan, New Zealand and the United States.

== Purpose ==
The purpose of Too Good To Go is to reduce food waste worldwide. It developed a mobile application that connects restaurants and stores that have unsold, surplus food, with customers who can then buy whatever food the outlet considers surplus to requirements—without being able to choose—at a much lower price than normal. The food on the app is priced at one-third its original price. The company claims this reduces the waste of food that would otherwise be discarded; food waste is a global problem that affects the environment. In three years active, the app reached more than 9.5 million users. As of 2022, more than 57.7 million users and 154,000 establishments have signed up, and 139 million meals have been collected.

In 2019, the company had 350 employees in Europe. As of June 2023 the company was estimated to have 1,289 employees.

== Use ==
Food outlets must notify the TGTG company about what they have available on each day, stating what sort of food they have (baked foods, meals, produce, vegan food), and the price for a 'surprise bag', whose contents they determine; the user cannot choose, but the original prices will be three or more times the TGTG price. Notification is made early based upon the quantity predicted to be left over, not at the end of a selling period.

Number of sold meals (Note: "saved meals", all countries) in millions
2016	2017	2018	2019	2020	2021	2022	2023	2024
0.47	1.9	6.4	19.1	28.6	52.5	83.5	121	135

Users must register to use the service. A mobile phone with an Internet connection running Android or iOS is needed. The user runs the TGTG app, which lists outlets available within a chosen distance and time range. The customer can then order and pay for a 'surprise bag'. The supplier can cancel an order at any time if the expected surplus is not available—the purchaser is notified by text message—and the purchaser can cancel with two hours' notice. The phone must be taken to the food supplier in a specified pickup time window, often 30 or 60 minutes long, and the transaction is finalised by swiping the app—connected to the Internet—to confirm collection.
