= Adidas Runtastic =

Austrian mobile fitness company

Runtastic GmbH
- Type: Subsidiary
- Industry: Health; Fitness
- Predecessor: Adidas miCoach
- Founded: October 2009; 17 years ago
- Headquarters: Pasching, Austria
- Number of employees: 280
- Parent: Adidas
- Website: runtastic.com

Runtastic GmbH was a digital health and fitness company from Austria.

On 5 August 2015, Adidas bought Runtastic for €220 million ($240 million).

On 25 September 2019, Runtastic was rebranded to Adidas Runtastic.

As of 1 July 2025, all operative business has ceased or was moved to within Adidas AG.

== History ==
The idea was made during a project at the University of Applied Sciences Upper Austria for tracking sailboat races.

The company was founded in 2009 by Florian Gschwandtner, Christian Kaar, René Giretzlehner, and Alfred Luger in Pasching, Upper Austria.

In August 2015, it was announced that Adidas had bought Runtastic out for €220 million ($240 million), this included the 50.1% stake Axel Springer SE bought in the company back in 2013, making Runtastic owned by Adidas.

At the beginning of 2019, Runtastic was making two apps. These were rebranded in September of the same year. The "Runtastic" app was rebranded to the "Adidas Running" app, and the "Results" app was rebranded to the "Adidas Training" app.

On March 20th, 2023, 70 Runtastic employees were let go. Later that year, on December 8th, 2023, Adidas announced the end of the "Adidas Training" app by March 31st, 2024.

Adidas made public on September 16th, 2024, that all 180 employees in Pasching, Vienna, and Salzburg will be let go by mid-2025. Any development of the "Adidas Running" app would be done in the company offices in Herzogenaurach, Amsterdam, and Saragossa in the future.

== Reception ==
The mobile devices used all the systems in the devices (e.g., GPS-tracking, audio and video recording and playback, web-syncing, social sharing). This can be seen in reviews of company products, for example from The Verge, TechCrunch, VentureBeat, or The Next Web.

== Bibliography ==
Runtastic and its products have been made into books and articles, some of which have been listed and commented here (APA 4th Ed.):

- Andrea Zajicek. (2011). Social Comm. Norderstedt: BoD. Page 228.
- Hubert Beck. (2012). Das große Buch vom Marathon — Lauftraining mit System. München: Stiebner Verlag. Page 307.
- Reiner Wichert, & Birgid Eberhardt. (2011). Ambient Assisted Living. Berlin: Springer. Page 287.
- Stefan Bölle. (2012). Joggen mit dem Handy: Zur Eignung von Smartphone-Apps als Trainingsbegleiter. München: Grin Verlag. Page 44.
- Stephan Verclas, & Claudia Linnhoff-Popien. (2011). Smart Mobile Apps. Berlin: Springer. Page 22.
- Tom Rosenkranz. (2012). Marketing im Outernet: Was kommt nach Social Media? München: Grin Verlag. Page 9.

== See also ==
- AllTrails
- Apple Health
- Endomondo
- Google Fit
- MSN Health & Fitness
- Runkeeper
- Strava
