= Nike Zoom Vomero 5 =

Line of shoes by Nike

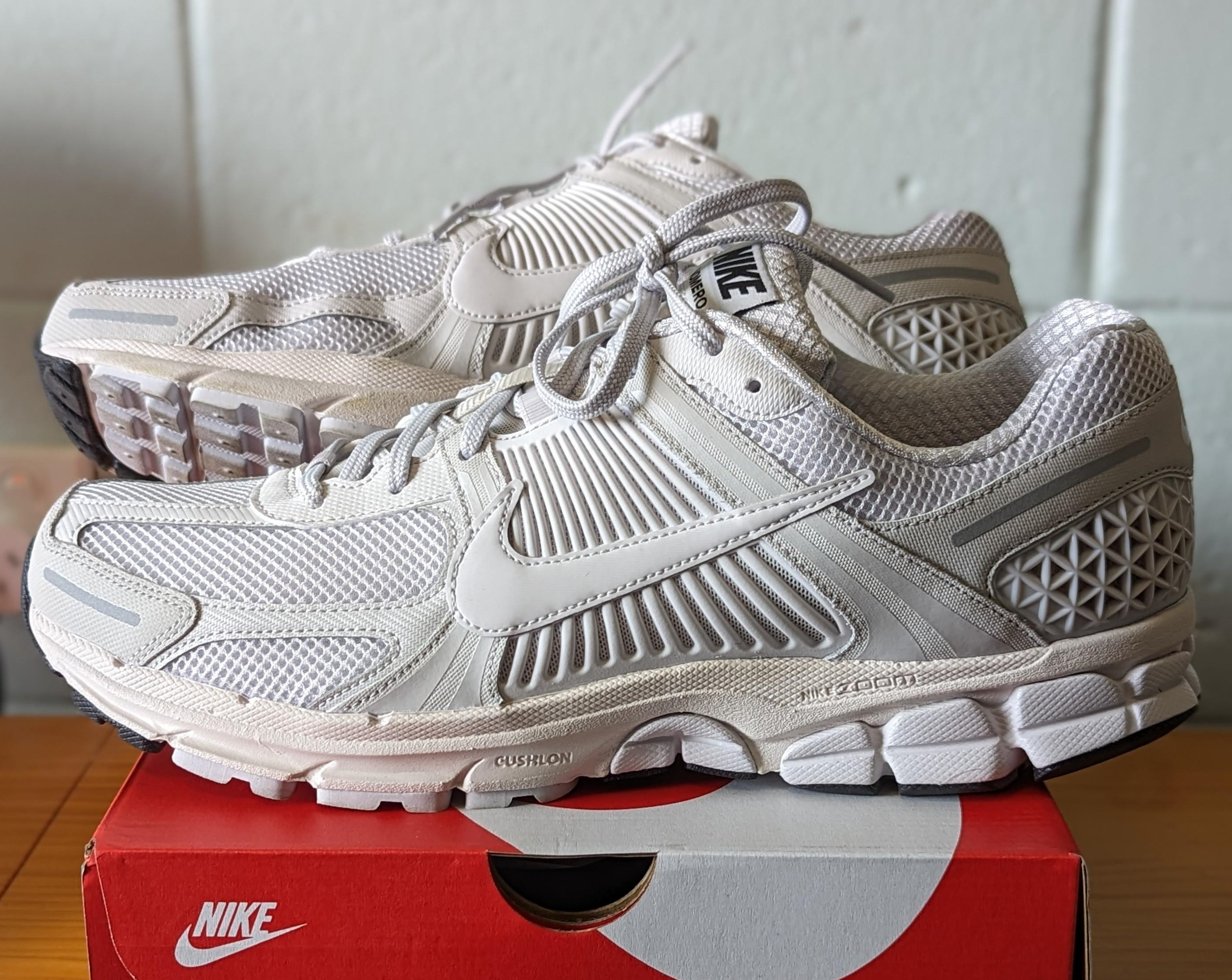
- Type: Sneakers
- Inventor: Nike, Inc.
- Inception: 2010; 16 years ago
- Manufacturer: Nike
- Available: Yes

Nike Zoom Vomero 5 is a running shoe released by Nike, Inc. The shoe is part of the Nike Vomero line of running shoes.

== Overview ==
The shoe was originally released as the Nike Zoom Vomero+ 5 in 2010. The line would refresh annually and this release was the update to last year's model, the fourth iteration released in 2009. The shoes were meant to be used with the company's Nike+iPod technology that allowed consumers to connect to their iPod and iPhone products to track their metrics.

The shoes use the company's Zoom Air and Cushlon technology. 2 Zoom Air units are located in the forefoot and heel of the shoe while Cushlon foam sits between the bottom and upper of the shoe, both allowing better cushioning for the runner. The 2 units also allow a more even distribution of the runner’s weight while running to offer better balance. The upper is made up of a lightweight mesh and synthetic leather. The middle of the shoe features a molded heel cage to secure the foot, this is supposed to offer enhanced support and stability. At the strobel has a profile of Bill Bowerman, Nike's co-founder with the text "Bowerman series". The original release featured a hole in the midsole to insert the Nike+ sensor so that the wearer could connect to their Apple product. The shoe only lasted a year before it was replaced by the sixth iteration in 2011.

== Popularity ==
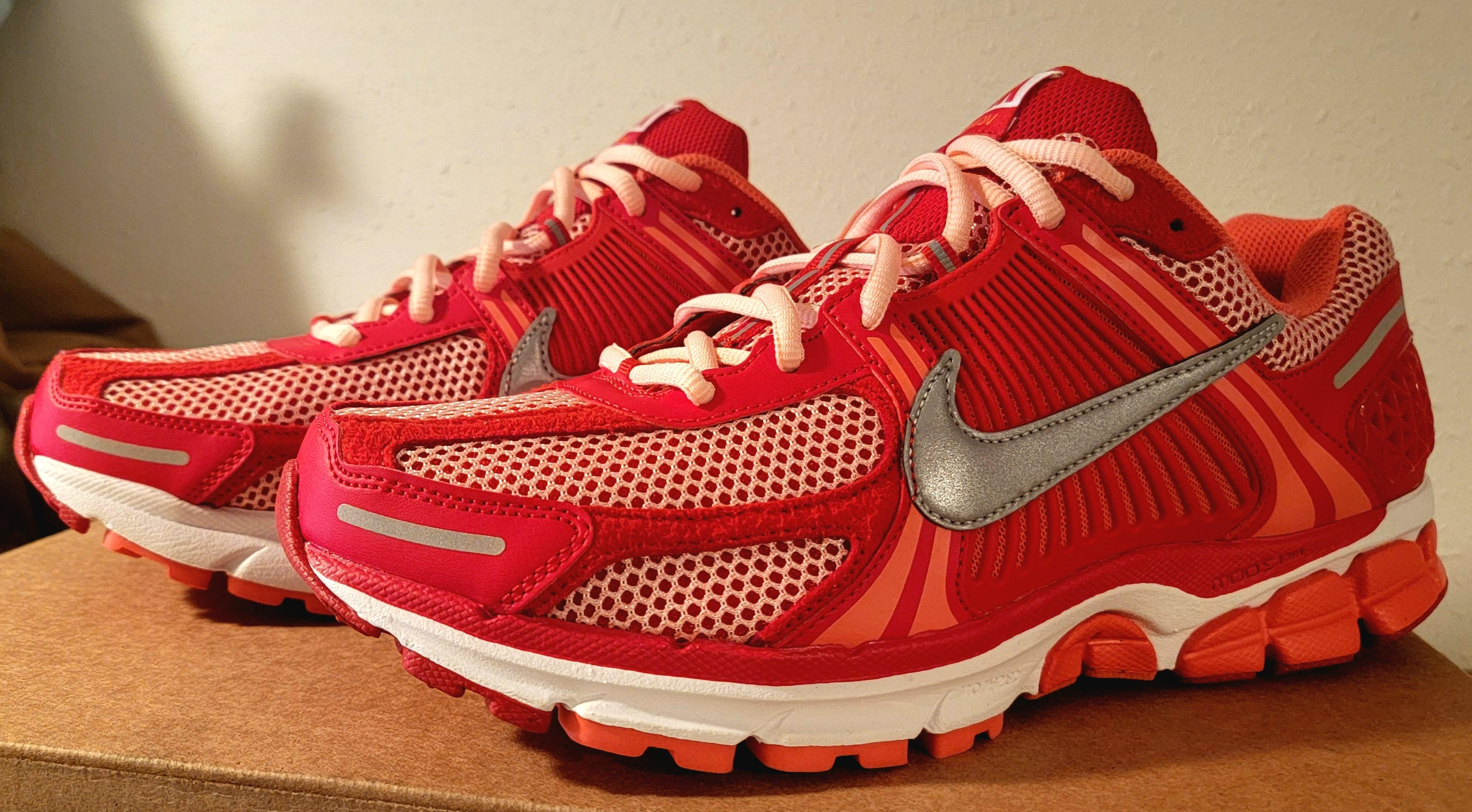
A red pair of Zoom Vomero 5

The early 2020s saw a rise in popularity in 2000s era running shoes, especially those with synthetic mesh uppers. Nike decided to re-release the model to capitalize on the trend, this time as just the "Nike Zoom Vomero 5" since it didn't have the Nike+ technology. The shoe soon became one of the company's most popular products due to its comfortability and various colors. Since then, the company has partnered with various collaborators to release models in different colorways and designs.
