= Mette Lykke =

Danish business executive

Mette Lykke (born 1981) is a Danish businesswoman, entrepreneur and investor. Mette Lykke is the CEO of food-tech startup Too Good To Go. She was formerly co-founder and CEO of Endomondo, later acquired by Under Armour.

== Early years and education ==
Mette Lykke comes from a family of self-employed people. Her grandfather started the chain 10–4 in 1947, which consists of both hardware stores and timber merchants.

Mette Lykke holds a master's degree in political science from Aarhus University.

== Career ==
In 2007, she co-founded the Endomondo, which was sold to Under Armour in 2015, for $85m. She then took over as VP of Connected Fitness until 2017.

In 2018, Mette Lykke was elected to the Gyldendal Board of Directors.
