= NikeFuel =

Proprietary unit of measurement

NikeFuel (symbol: ⊕) is a proprietary unit of measurement for tracking fitness activity developed by the athletics company Nike, Inc. The exact formula for the measuring unit was proprietary and depended on the device or service tracking it. However, independent experiments found an approximate 3-4 calories-to-fuel ratio. The general idea is that activity and movement — whether tracked by a wearable electronics device, GPS tracking service, or game — is translated into a universal point system for physical activity. The FuelBand was discontinued in 2014, and the NikeFuel app and section disappeared in 2018.

The points system was one of the main differentiators of the slate of devices and services under the Nike+ brand. All products in the ecosystem allowed users to earn NikeFuel. Products included the Nike+ FuelBand accelerometer wristband; other wristbands such as SportWatch and SportBand; Nike+ for iPod, the Nike+ Running and Nike+ Basketball apps for iOS and Android; and the Nike+ Kinect Training motion-tracking exercise game for Xbox 360.

== See also ==
- Nike+ FuelBand
- Nike+
- Nike, Inc.
- Activity tracker
- GPS watch
- Smartwatch
