= IPod Nano =

Discontinued line of portable media players by Apple

iPod Nano
- Seventh-generation iPod Nano in Black
- Developer: Apple
- Manufacturer: Apple; Foxconn
- Product family: iPod
- Type: Portable media player
- Lifespan: September 7, 2005 – July 27, 2017 (11 years, 10 months)
- Discontinued: July 27, 2017
- Operating system: 1.3.1 (1st gen); 1.1.3 (2nd, 3rd gen); 1.0.4 (4th gen); 1.0.2 (5th gen); 1.2 (6th gen); 1.0.4/1.1.2 (7th gen)
- Storage: 1–16 GB (flash memory)
- Display: 1st–2nd gen: 132 × 176 px, 1.5 in (38 mm), color LCD; 3rd–4th gen: 240 × 320 px, 2 in (51 mm), color LCD; 5th gen: 240 × 376 px, 2.22 in (56 mm), color LCD; 6th gen: 240 × 240 px, 1.55 in (39 mm), color LCD; 7th gen: 240 × 432 px, 2.5 in (64 mm), color LCD
- Input: 1st–5th gen: Click wheel 6th–7th gen: Multi-touch touchscreen
- Connectivity: 1st–3rd gen: 3.5 mm headphone jack (TRS connector), 30-pin connector 4th–6th gen: 3.5 mm headphone jack (TRRS connector), 30-pin connector 7th gen: 3.5 mm headphone jack (TRRS connector), Bluetooth 4.0, Lightning connector
- Power: Lithium-ion battery
- Predecessor: iPod Mini
- Successor: Apple Watch
- Related: iPod Classic iPod Shuffle iPod Touch
- Website: https://web.archive.org/web/20170407063919/http://www.apple.com/ipod-nano/ at the Wayback Machine (archived April 7, 2017)

The iPod Nano (stylized and marketed as iPod nano) is a discontinued portable media player designed and formerly marketed by Apple. The first-generation model was introduced on September 7, 2005, as a replacement for the iPod Mini, using flash memory for storage. The iPod Nano went through several models, or generations, after its introduction. Apple discontinued the iPod Nano on July 27, 2017.

== Development ==
Development work on the design of the iPod Nano started only nine months before its launch date. The Nano was launched in two colors (black and white) and two storage sizes: 2 GB (roughly 500 songs) and 4 GB (1000 songs). On February 7, 2006, Apple updated the lineup with the 1 GB model (240 songs). Apple also released accessories, including armbands and silicone "tubes" designed to bring color to the Nano and protect it from scratches, as well as a combination lanyard–earphone accessory that hangs around the neck and avoids the problem of tangled earphone cords.

== History ==
=== 1st generation ===
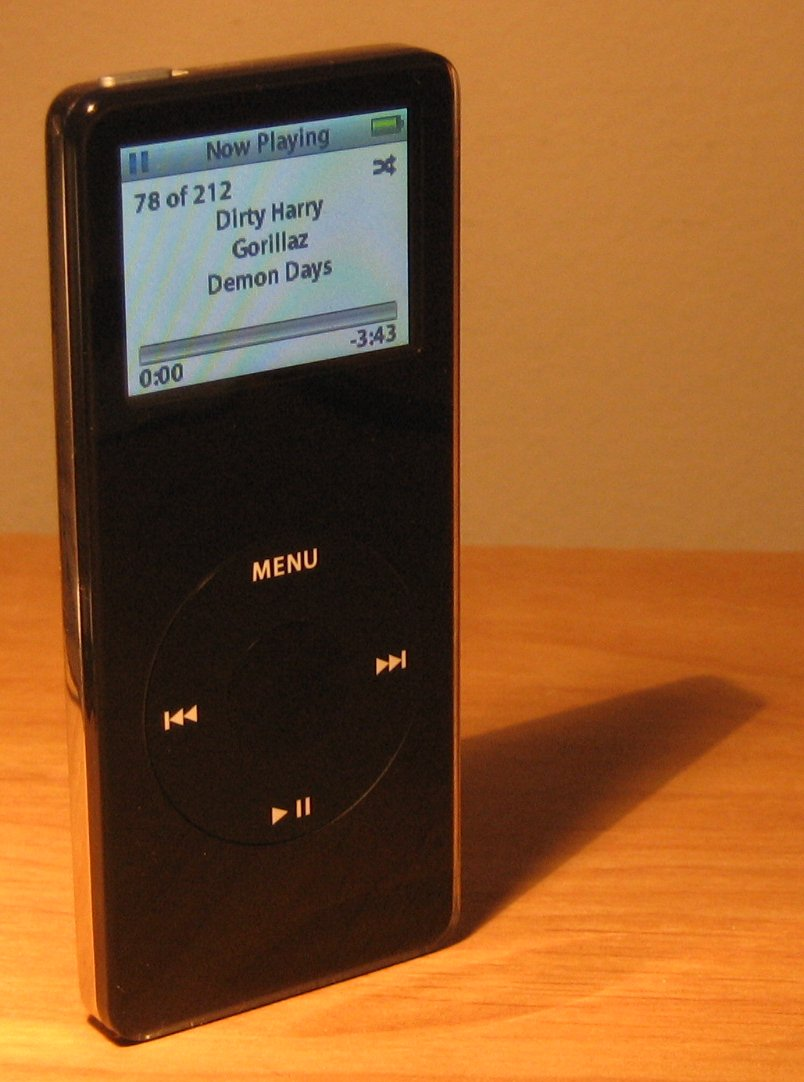
Black first-generation iPod Nano

On September 7, 2005, Apple introduced the iPod Nano and the Motorola ROKR E1 at a media event, with Steve Jobs pointing to the small watch pocket in his jeans and asking, "Ever wonder what this pocket is for?" Advertising emphasized the iPod Nano's small size: 40 millimeters (1.57 in) wide, 90 millimeters (3.54 in) long, 6.9 millimeters (0.27 in) thick and weighing 42 grams (1.5 oz). The stated battery life is up to 14 hours, while the screen is 176 × 132 pixels, 38 millimeters (1.5 in) diagonal, displaying 65,536 colors (16-bit color). The device has a 1, 2, or 4 GB capacity. On November 11, 2011, Apple announced a recall on this model of iPod Nano due to a battery overheat issue.

=== 2nd generation ===
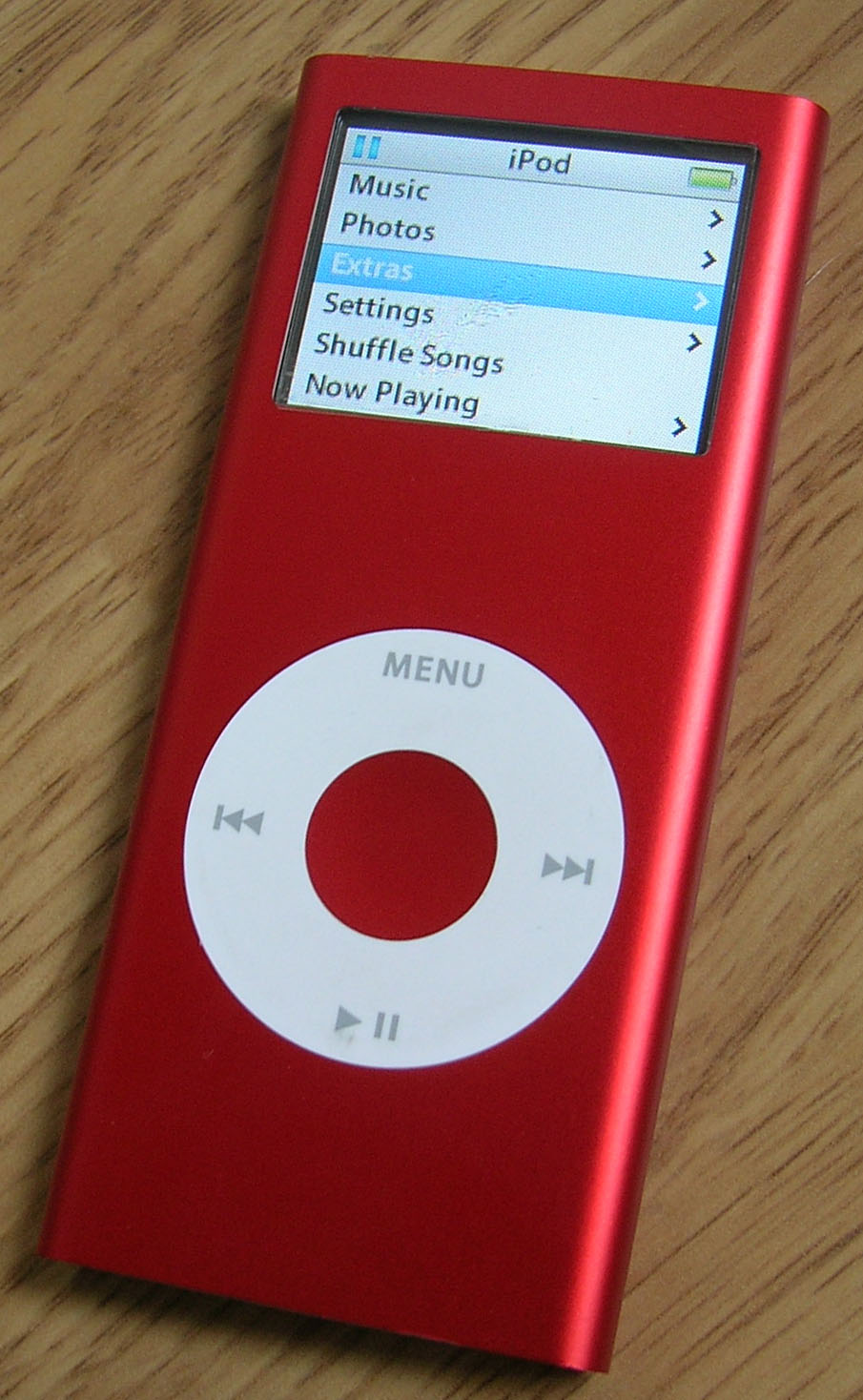
A Product Red second-generation iPod Nano

The second-generation iPod Nano was announced at Apple's "It's Showtime" event.

On September 25, 2006, Apple updated the Nano line. The second-generation Nano features a scratch-resistant, anodized aluminum casing like the earlier Mini's design; the multiple color choices mirror those of the Mini as well. However, unlike the second-generation Mini, the button labels are gray instead of matching the Nano's casing (except for the black Nano, which has a black click wheel). The second-generation Nano featured a 40% brighter, "more vibrant" display, a battery life upgrade (from 14 to 24 hours), and storage sizes of 2, 4, and 8 GB. The second generation also introduced gapless playback of audio files, along with a new search option.

The 2 GB model was available in silver only. The 4 GB was originally available in green, blue, silver, and pink, while the 8 GB model was initially only available in black. Apple said that the second-generation iPod Nano's packaging is "32% lighter with 52% less volume than the first generation", thereby reducing environmental impact and shipping costs.

On October 13, 2006, Apple announced a special edition iPod Nano: Product Red, with a red exterior and 4 GB of storage. For each red iPod Nano sold in the United States, Apple donated $10 to the Product Red initiative, while retaining the regular price. On November 3, 2006, Apple introduced a red 8 GB model, due to "outstanding customer demand", again retaining the same price point of the equivalent black model.

=== 3rd generation ===
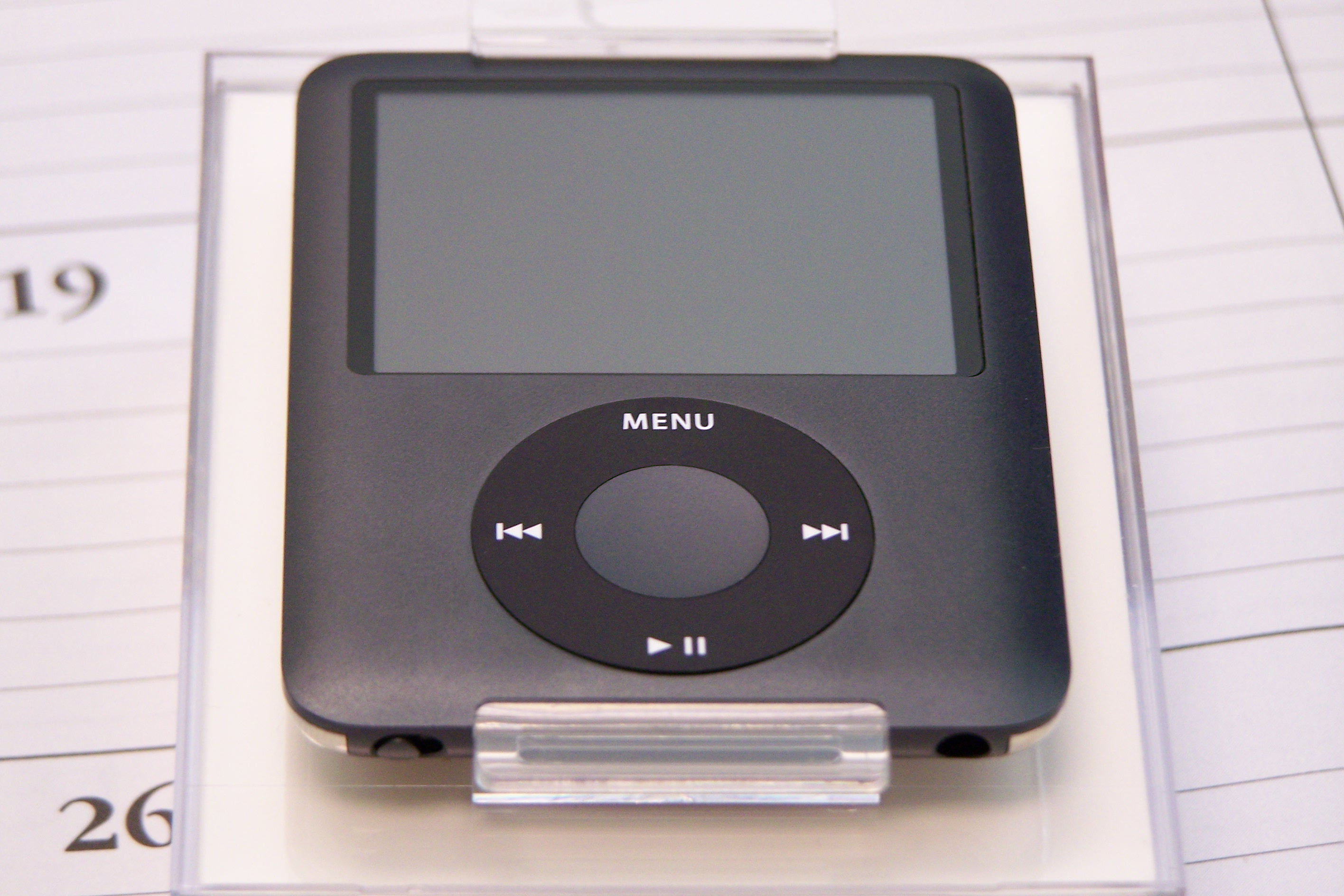
A black 8 GB third-generation iPod Nano

Apple updated the design of the Nano again on September 5, 2007. The third-generation Nano features a 2-inch (51 mm) QVGA (320 × 240) screen and a shorter, wider, heavier design, with new colors. New features include browsing via Cover Flow, a new user interface, video playback, and support for new iPod games. Users had to repurchase games bought a month before the debut of the new iPod as they were not supported. The Nano was announced in a 4 GB version in silver and an 8 GB version in silver, turquoise, mint green, black, and Product Red. The battery lasts for approximately 24 hours on audio playback and approximately five hours on video playback. On January 22, 2008, Apple released a pink version of the 8 GB iPod Nano.

Combining elements from previous generations of the iPod Nano, the third-generation Nano has an aluminum front plate and a stainless steel back plate. The Nano also features a new minimalistic hold switch, similar to the iPod Shuffle's power switch, which has been moved to the bottom of the player. The 2-inch (51 mm) screen had the highest pixel density of any Apple product at the time at 204 pixels per inch, having the same pixel count as the 2.5-inch (64 mm) display of the iPod Classic.

On October 6, 2007, Apple released a firmware update (1.0.2) via iTunes that they said would improve Cover Flow and yield faster menu navigation. The update was also released for the iPod Classic. On November 28, 2007, Apple released another firmware update (1.0.3) via iTunes, which includes unspecified bug fixes. On January 15, 2008, version 1.1 was released, which adds support for iTunes movie rentals, music song lyrics support and includes more unspecified bug fixes. Apple released update version 1.1.2 in May 2008 and version 1.1.3 in July 2008 with more bug fixes.

=== 4th generation ===
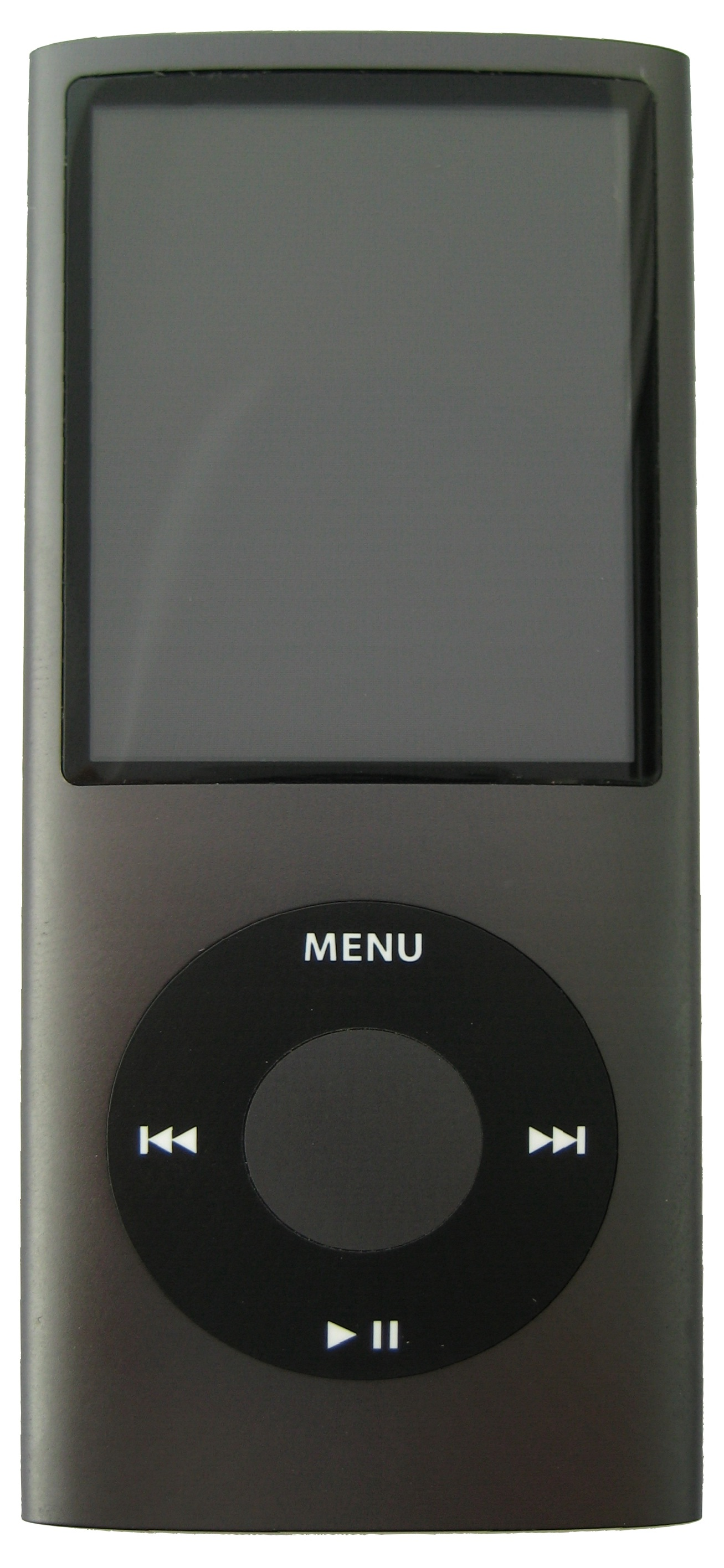
Fourth-generation iPod Nano

At Apple's "Let's Rock" event on September 9, 2008, the fourth-generation iPod Nano was officially announced, returning to the narrow form factor of the first- and second-generation models, while retaining and rotating the 2-inch (51 mm) screen from the third-gen model. It is also thinner than the first-, second-, and third-generation Nano, measuring 90.7 millimeters (3.57 in) tall, 38.7 millimeters (1.52 in) wide, and 6.2 millimeters (0.24 in) thick, and weighing 36.8 grams (1.30 oz). It has a curved aluminum shell and glass screen (with the glass screen being held in place only by the shell). Apple said the battery lasts 24 hours of music playback, and four hours of video playback, compared to the five hours of the previous generation.

The six previous colors were replaced by silver, black, purple, light blue, green, yellow, orange, red and pink, for a total of nine, although the Product Red color was only available directly from Apple's website and retail stores. Apple marketed the new colors as "Nano-chromatic". Also added is an accelerometer which allows the Nano to shuffle songs by shaking it, the option between portrait and landscape display modes by tilting the iPod left or right, and access to Cover Flow when tilted sideways. Videos, however, can only be played in landscape mode. The user interface was also refreshed, adding a more stylized look in keeping with the new hardware design. It includes a new voice recording feature which starts automatically when an Apple-compatible microphone is plugged in. It also includes the new "Genius" feature, introduced by Apple the same day, which automatically creates playlists based on a selected song using an algorithm built by Apple.

It was touted as "the most environmentally friendly iPod Apple has ever made", containing arsenic-free glass and a BFR-, mercury-, and PVC-free design. Apple also said it was highly recyclable. The fourth-generation iPod Nano was shipped in cases similar to the second generation, with a clear window in the front, and was marketed in capacities of either 8 GB or 16 GB. However, there were reports of an unannounced 4 GB model in some European markets. The iPod Quiz game was dropped in favor of a Maze game that made use of the iPod's accelerometer, like the labyrinth games originally made popular on the iPhone and iPod Touch.

The fourth generation dropped support for charging via FireWire. "This change means that any dock accessories that use the dock connector's FireWire pins to send power—many older speakers and car chargers, for example—will not charge the fourth-generation iPod Nano."

=== 5th generation ===
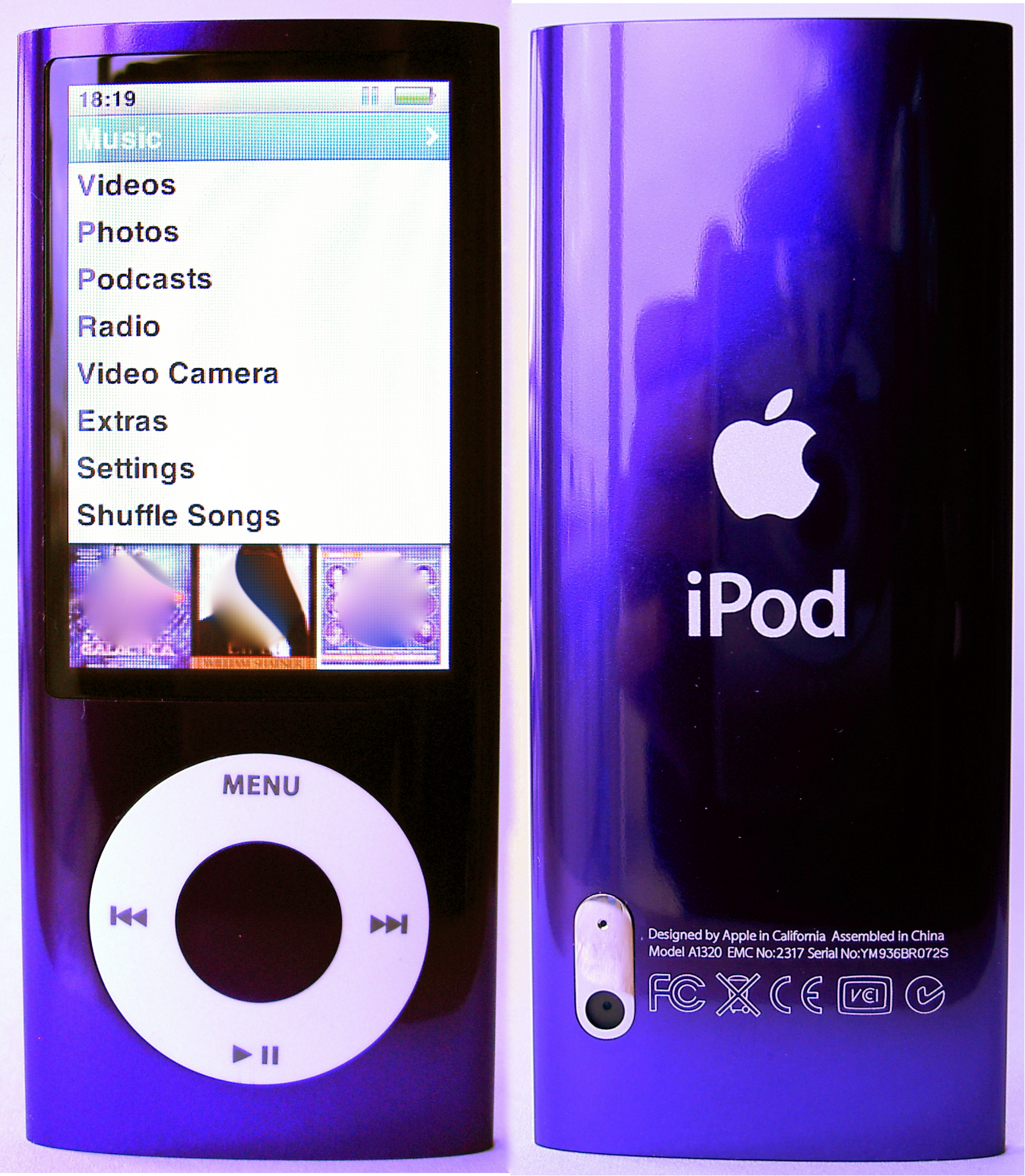
The front and back of a fifth-generation iPod Nano, showing the built-in camera and microphone

At Apple's September 9, 2009, event, the fifth-generation iPod Nano was unveiled with reduced prices on the larger models (at the time of release, the 8 GB was priced at US$149 and the 16 GB at $179), a larger, 56.3-millimeter (2.22 in) diagonal screen (up from 50.8 millimeters (2.00 in) in third- and fourth-generation iPod Nano models), which is also wider, integrated video camera with 16 special effects, microphone, FM radio with iTunes tagging (via RDS) and supporting multiple radio regions including Americas, Asia, Australia, Europe, and Japan.

As well as continuing to offer picture viewing and video playback, it also includes Live Pause, a built-in pedometer, Nike+iPod Support and a speaker. This model also has the Genius Mix feature installed.

The headphone jack and dock connector swap locations so that the headphone jack is to the left of the dock connector. Therefore, the fifth-generation iPod Nano uses a different Apple Universal Dock insert than the fourth generation.

The fifth-generation iPod Nano has nine finishes: silver, black, purple, blue, yellow, orange, Product Red, green, and pink. All have a glossier, shinier finish than the fourth generation. Just like the fourth-generation iPod Nano, the Product Red Nano was only available on the Apple Online Store and Apple Retail Store.

This generation was discontinued on September 1, 2010. Alongside the 2009 revision of the sixth-generation iPod Classic, it is the last Apple product to use the click wheel.

=== 6th generation ===
Sixth-generation iPod Nano

At a media event on September 1, 2010, Apple announced the sixth-generation iPod Nano, which, among many new features, is designed around a high-resolution square touch-screen.

The device features a small 1.55-inch multi-touch screen with a lower resolution of 240 × 240 pixels but a higher pixel density of 220 pixels per inch, as opposed to the larger 2.2-inch screen on the fifth-generation iPod Nano. The device has a 0.39 watt-hour battery rated at 3.7 volts, giving a capacity of 105 mAh, and specified to give 24 hours of music playback on a single full charge. The device takes about three hours for a full charge. The device retains the same 30-pin dock connector as previous generations, but loses the previous generation's video camera, built-in voice recorder microphone (although plugging in headphones with a built-in microphone reveals a Voice Memos app) and built-in speaker, and games. It also loses support for video playback, but music videos and video podcasts (vodcasts) can be synced onto the device, and the audio from them plays on the device, with a single key-frame shown on the screen. It still includes the Nike+iPod fitness option as well as an FM radio tuner with RDS (Radio Data System). It has a black-on-white screen contrast option and other accessibility options. The sixth-generation iPod Nano has the same price point as the fifth-generation device.

A firmware update (version 1.1) for the Nano was released on February 28, 2011. The update adds the ability to change songs or pause with a double click of the sleep/wake button. It also adds the ability to turn the device off by holding the sleep/wake button. The user interface is also enhanced. On October 4, 2011, the iPod Nano 1.2 update was unveiled at the Apple "Let's Talk iPhone" event at the Town Hall, 4 Infinite Loop. This update adds the option to increase or decrease the size of the home buttons for easier use. The update also adds a better fitness app, which has a better pedometer split into walking and running style. The update also includes 16 new clock faces, which includes designs such as a Nixie tube clock face or an old-style clock face, and Disney-licensed designs, such as Mickey Mouse and Kermit the Frog, bringing the number of clock faces to 18. Three more background images were also added.

Some accessory makers produced watch bands for the sixth-generation Nano, allowing it to be worn like a watch. In September 2013, TUAW compared the iPod Nano to the Samsung Galaxy Gear, and considered the three-year-old model to be a "better, cheaper smartwatch" than the Galaxy Gear because of its more complete functionality in comparison, and its inclusion of a headphone jack.

=== 7th generation ===
Seventh-generation iPod Nano models

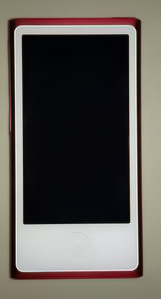
A 2015 model of the seventh-generation iPod Nano having the Product Red color scheme

Apple announced the seventh and final generation of the iPod Nano on September 12, 2012. The (maximum) internal storage capacity was not increased compared with the previous model but a single, 16 GB version of the seventh-generation iPod Nano was announced at the product launch. Apple described it as their "thinnest iPod ever". It is 38% thinner (5.4 mm) than the sixth-generation (8.78 mm), and adds the ability to use Bluetooth 4.0 wireless headsets, speakers and other devices (such as heart-rate monitors). It retains the Nike+iPod fitness option as well as an FM radio tuner which works when connected to headphones or a stereo jack. On July 15, 2015, Apple refreshed the iPod Nano, offering five more subdued colors (gold, silver, blue, pink and space gray) compared to the original seven jewel tones, in addition to the Product Red model. On July 27, 2017, Apple discontinued the iPod Nano, along with the iPod Shuffle, making the iPod Touch the last remaining model of the iPod line. This was the thinnest device made by Apple until the iPad Pro (M4) in 2024.

The seventh generation features a 2.5-inch, touch-sensitive 432 × 240 display at 202 ppi, Bluetooth 4.0 (with support for Nike+iPod wireless systems), and a Lightning connector to replace the original 30-pin dock connector. Although its software resembles the iOS user interface, it is not an iOS device. The current and final version of the iPod software for this device is 1.0.4 for the initial release model and 1.1.2 for the mid-2015 refresh model.

== Specifications ==
All models are obsolete:

Generation and Appearance		Capacity	Colors	Connection	Original release date	Minimum OS to sync	Rated battery life (hours)	Screen (pixels)	Audio processor	On-board RAM	Physical size	Weight
1st	1st generation iPod Nano	1 GB	Black; White	USB (FireWire for charging only)	February 7, 2006	Mac: 10.3.4; Windows: 2000 iTunes 5 or later	Audio: 14; Slideshow: 4	176 × 132; 145 ppi (16-bit color)	Wolfson; WM8975G	32 MB	89 mm 41 mm 6.9 mm Dimensions of the first-generation iPod Nano	42.5 g (1.5 oz)
1st	1st generation iPod Nano	2 GB	Black; White	USB (FireWire for charging only)	September 7, 2005	Mac: 10.3.4; Windows: 2000 iTunes 5 or later	Audio: 14; Slideshow: 4	176 × 132; 145 ppi (16-bit color)	Wolfson; WM8975G	32 MB	89 mm 41 mm 6.9 mm Dimensions of the first-generation iPod Nano	42.5 g (1.5 oz)
1st	1st generation iPod Nano	4 GB	Black; White	USB (FireWire for charging only)	September 7, 2005	Mac: 10.3.4; Windows: 2000 iTunes 5 or later	Audio: 14; Slideshow: 4	176 × 132; 145 ppi (16-bit color)	Wolfson; WM8975G	32 MB	89 mm 41 mm 6.9 mm Dimensions of the first-generation iPod Nano	42.5 g (1.5 oz)
1st	1st generation iPod Nano	Replaced Mini. Color screen for picture viewing; 1 GB version released later.										
2nd		2 GB	Silver	USB (FireWire for charging only)	September 12, 2006	Mac: 10.3.9; Windows: 2000 iTunes 7 or later	Audio: 24; Slideshow: 5	176 × 132; 145 ppi (16-bit color)	Wolfson; WM8975	32 MB	89 mm 41 mm 6.6 mm	40 g (1.41 oz)
2nd		4 GB	Silver; Blue Green; Pink	USB (FireWire for charging only)	September 12, 2006	Mac: 10.3.9; Windows: 2000 iTunes 7 or later	Audio: 24; Slideshow: 5	176 × 132; 145 ppi (16-bit color)	Wolfson; WM8975	32 MB	89 mm 41 mm 6.6 mm	40 g (1.41 oz)
2nd		4 GB	Product Red (Note: A Special Edition color exclusively available on Apple's website.)	USB (FireWire for charging only)	October 13, 2006	Mac: 10.3.9; Windows: 2000 iTunes 7 or later	Audio: 24; Slideshow: 5	176 × 132; 145 ppi (16-bit color)	Wolfson; WM8975	32 MB	89 mm 41 mm 6.6 mm	40 g (1.41 oz)
2nd		8 GB	Black	USB (FireWire for charging only)	September 12, 2006	Mac: 10.3.9; Windows: 2000 iTunes 7 or later	Audio: 24; Slideshow: 5	176 × 132; 145 ppi (16-bit color)	Wolfson; WM8975	32 MB	89 mm 41 mm 6.6 mm	40 g (1.41 oz)
2nd		8 GB	Product Red	USB (FireWire for charging only)	2007	Mac: 10.3.9; Windows: 2000 iTunes 7 or later	Audio: 24; Slideshow: 5	176 × 132; 145 ppi (16-bit color)	Wolfson; WM8975	32 MB	89 mm 41 mm 6.6 mm	40 g (1.41 oz)
2nd		Anodized aluminium casing with plastic top and bottom; six colors available.										
3rd	4 GB third-generation iPod Nano	4 GB	Silver	USB (FireWire for charging only)	September 5, 2007	Mac: 10.4.8 (10.4.9 Recommended); Windows: XP iTunes 7.4 or later	Audio: 24; Video: 5	320 × 240; 204 ppi	Wolfson; WM1870	32 MB	70 mm 52 mm 6.6 mm	49.3 g (1.74 oz)
3rd	4 GB third-generation iPod Nano	8 GB	Silver Blue; Green; Black; Product Red	USB (FireWire for charging only)	September 5, 2007	Mac: 10.4.8 (10.4.9 Recommended); Windows: XP iTunes 7.4 or later	Audio: 24; Video: 5	320 × 240; 204 ppi	Wolfson; WM1870	32 MB	70 mm 52 mm 6.6 mm	49.3 g (1.74 oz)
3rd	4 GB third-generation iPod Nano	8 GB	Pink	USB (FireWire for charging only)	January 22, 2008	Mac: 10.4.8 (10.4.9 Recommended); Windows: XP iTunes 7.4 or later	Audio: 24; Video: 5	320 × 240; 204 ppi	Wolfson; WM1870	32 MB	70 mm 52 mm 6.6 mm	49.3 g (1.74 oz)
3rd	4 GB third-generation iPod Nano	51 mm QVGA screen; lighter color shades and chrome back; new interface; video-playing capability.										
4th	Fourth-generation iPod Nano (black model pictured)	4 GB	Silver; Black; Purple; Blue; Green; Yellow; Orange; Pink; Product Red	USB	September 9, 2008	Mac: 10.4.11; Windows: XP iTunes 8 or later	Audio: 24; Video: 4	240 × 320; 204 ppi	Cirrus Logic CS42L58	32 MB	91 mm 38 mm 6.1 mm	36.8 g (1.3 oz)
4th	Fourth-generation iPod Nano (black model pictured)	8 GB	Silver; Black; Purple; Blue; Green; Yellow; Orange; Pink; Product Red	USB	September 9, 2008	Mac: 10.4.11; Windows: XP iTunes 8 or later	Audio: 24; Video: 4	240 × 320; 204 ppi	Cirrus Logic CS42L58	32 MB	91 mm 38 mm 6.1 mm	36.8 g (1.3 oz)
4th	Fourth-generation iPod Nano (black model pictured)	16 GB	Silver; Black; Purple; Blue; Green; Yellow; Orange; Pink; Product Red	USB	September 9, 2008	Mac: 10.4.11; Windows: XP iTunes 8 or later	Audio: 24; Video: 4	240 × 320; 204 ppi	Cirrus Logic CS42L58	32 MB	91 mm 38 mm 6.1 mm	36.8 g (1.3 oz)
4th	Fourth-generation iPod Nano (black model pictured)	Curved enclosure and new colors; revised interface; voice recording features; "shake to shuffle"; accelerometer; limited 4 GB models										
5th	Purple fifth-generation iPod Nano with camera and front and back views	8 GB	Black; Silver; Purple; Pink; Yellow; Blue; Green; Orange; Product Red	USB	September 13, 2009	Mac: 10.4.11; Windows: XP iTunes 9 or later	Audio: 24; Video: 5	240 × 376; 204 ppi 0.3-megapixel camera	Cirrus Logic CLI1480A	64 MB	91 mm 38 mm 6.1 mm	36.3 g (1.28 oz)
5th	Purple fifth-generation iPod Nano with camera and front and back views	16 GB	Black; Silver; Purple; Pink; Yellow; Blue; Green; Orange; Product Red	USB	September 13, 2009	Mac: 10.4.11; Windows: XP iTunes 9 or later	Audio: 24; Video: 5	240 × 376; 204 ppi 0.3-megapixel camera	Cirrus Logic CLI1480A	64 MB	91 mm 38 mm 6.1 mm	36.3 g (1.28 oz)
5th	Purple fifth-generation iPod Nano with camera and front and back views	Polished aluminium case including a larger screen, video camera, built-in microphone, FM radio tuner, recorder and a pedometer. Retains entire color line from fourth generation.										
6th	Sixth-generation silver iPod Nano	8 GB	Silver; Graphite; Blue; Green; Orange; Pink; Product Red	USB	September 1, 2010	Mac: 10.5.8; Windows: XP iTunes 10 or later	Audio: 24	240 × 240; 220 ppi	Cirrus Logic CLI1544C0	64 MB	37.5 mm 41 mm 8.78 mm	21.1 g (0.74 oz)
6th	Sixth-generation silver iPod Nano	16 GB	Silver; Graphite; Blue; Green; Orange; Pink; Product Red	USB	September 1, 2010	Mac: 10.5.8; Windows: XP iTunes 10 or later	Audio: 24	240 × 240; 220 ppi	Cirrus Logic CLI1544C0	64 MB	37.5 mm 41 mm 8.78 mm	21.1 g (0.74 oz)
6th	Sixth-generation silver iPod Nano	Multi-touch screen. No click-wheel, camera, or video playback. The 1.1 OS update brought the ability of turning off by holding the sleep/wake button. Same price range as the fifth generation, except in Europe, Japan and Australia. Features iOS-like interface design and still contains "shake to shuffle", FM radio, and pedometer. The 1.2 OS update added built-in accelerometer support which works with Nike+iPod without the need to attach a Nike+ receiver or shoe sensor.										
7th	Seventh-generation silver iPod Nano	16 GB	Slate (2012–2013)	USB	October 12, 2012	Mac: 10.6.8; Windows: XP iTunes 10.7 or later	Audio: 30; Video: 3.5	240 × 432; 202 ppi	Cirrus Logic CLI1599A1	64 MB	76.5 mm 39.6 mm 5.4 mm	31 g (1.1 oz)
7th	Seventh-generation silver iPod Nano	16 GB	Space gray (2013–2017) 2012–2015; Silver; Pink; Yellow; Green; Blue; Purple; Product Red	USB	October 12, 2012	Mac: 10.6.8; Windows: XP iTunes 10.7 or later	Audio: 30; Video: 3.5	240 × 432; 202 ppi	Cirrus Logic CLI1599A1	64 MB	76.5 mm 39.6 mm 5.4 mm	31 g (1.1 oz)
7th	Seventh-generation silver iPod Nano	16 GB	2015 models Space gray Silver; Gold; Pink; Blue; Product Red	USB	July 15, 2015	Mac: 10.7.5; Windows: 7 iTunes 12.2 or later	Audio: 30; Video: 3.5	240 × 432; 202 ppi	Cirrus Logic CLI1599A1	64 MB	76.5 mm 39.6 mm 5.4 mm	31 g (1.1 oz)
7th	Seventh-generation silver iPod Nano	New, larger 2.5-inch Multi-Touch screen, and "Home button" similar to iPhone but does not run iOS. Unibody now made of anodized aluminium. Also, with larger screen, supports video playback. The 30-pin dock connector has been replaced by the new Lightning connector. Bluetooth 4.0 wireless connectivity. New Space gray color option replaces Slate as of September 10, 2013. New colors were introduced on July 15, 2015. Discontinued on July 27, 2017.										

== Supported audio formats ==
Lossy:

- AAC (8 to 320 kbit/s)
  - Protected AAC (from the iTunes Store)
- MP3 (8 to 320 kbit/s, including variable bitrate files)
- Audible (formats 2, 3 and 4)

Lossless and original PCM:

- Apple Lossless
- AIFF
- WAV

Other container:

- MP4

== Reception ==
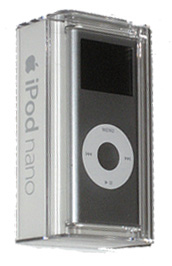
The size of the package was reduced 50 percent with the introduction of the second generation. The packaging of the fourth- and fifth-generation models mimics this packaging, while the third generation used a larger but otherwise similar version of it.

The initial consumer response to the iPod Nano was overwhelmingly positive and sales were heavy. The Nano sold its first million units in 17 days, helping Apple to a record billion-dollar profit in 2005.

Apple's release of the iPod Nano as a replacement for the iPod Mini was viewed by many as a risky move. Steve Jobs argued that the iPod Nano was a necessary risk since competitors were beginning to catch up to the iPod Mini in terms of design and features, and believed the iPod Nano would prove to be even more popular and successful than the iPod Mini.

=== Durability and repairability ===
Within days of the Nano's release, some users reported damage to the Nano, suggesting that the LCD screen had become so scratched that it was unreadable, even when the backlight was on. Many reported fine scratches on Nano models, caused by microfiber cloths. Other owners reported that their Nano's screen cracked without use of excessive force.

On September 27, 2005, Apple confirmed that a small percentage ("less than 1/10 of 1 percent") of iPod Nanos shipped with a faulty screen and agreed to replace any that had cracked screens, but denied the iPod Nano was more susceptible to scratching than prior iPods. Apple started shipping iPod Nanos with a protective sleeve to protect them from scratches. In October 2005 a class action lawsuit was filed against Apple, with the plaintiffs seeking reimbursement for the device, legal fees, and "unlawful or illegal profits" from sales of the iPod Nano. Lawyers for the plaintiffs claimed that the devices "scratch excessively during normal usage, rendering the screen on the Nanos unreadable, and violating state consumer protection statutes". Similar lawsuits were later filed in Mexico and the United Kingdom.

In early 2009, Apple was in the process of settling a court case over the scratched iPod Nano screens. It was suggested that Apple should set aside $22 million to refund users. At the time, it required a Judge's sign-off on the terms by April 28, 2009. Some commentators such as BusinessWeek's Arik Hesseldahl have criticized the lawsuits. Hesseldahl dismissed them as "stupid" and suggested that they benefitted "no one but the trial lawyers", but also suggested that Apple could have avoided litigation by offering "full refunds on unwanted Nanos" instead of charging a re-stocking fee and lengthening the return period from 14 days (when purchased through Apple retail or online) to 30 or 60 days.

== Incidents ==
In April 2007 in Australia, an iPod Nano caught on fire while being charged on a PC.

In another incident in October 2007, a man's iPod Nano set his pants on fire while he was working at Hartsfield–Jackson Atlanta International Airport.

In addition, an iPod Nano sparked in Japan in January 2008 while it was recharging. Although no one was injured during the incident, Apple investigated the incident. It was reported on August 19, 2008, that 17 incidents of abnormal overheating with first-generation iPod Nano units while recharging had been reported in Japan, including cases in which tatami mats had been charred. On August 10, 2010, Apple Japan released a statement saying that it would replace any iPod Nano models that overheated.

Since 2010, users have been reporting the sixth-generation iPod Nano's sleep/wake button stuck after months of use, making it impossible to activate the device without the help of a computer or a dock accessory. According to a technical inspection, the device uses double-sided tape to hold the button in place, indicating a possible design fault.

On November 11, 2011, Apple announced the replacement program for the first-generation iPod Nano, intended to address concerns over overheating batteries. Customers with affected devices can fill out a claim form to confirm eligibility for replacement. Defective devices will be replaced within six weeks and will carry 90-day warranties. Customers who have personalized iPod Nano devices will not be able to receive personalization on their replacement devices. During the replacement process, there have been several reports of users receiving a sixth-generation iPod Nano as replacement instead of the expected first-generation device that users sent in during the recall. Because using the sixth-generation iPod Nano with a Mac computer requires iTunes 10 or later, which in turn requires Mac OS X Leopard, Apple will upgrade the system software of participants running earlier versions of macOS on request, but this leaves users who do not have access to iTunes without a working device (because Apple changed the hashing of the music database which prevented the sixth-generation iPod Nano from being used with open source software via libgpod).

Timeline of compact iPod models
Sources: Apple press release library, Mactracker Apple Inc. model database
