= Nike+iPod =

Activity tracker device

- Manufacturer: Nike, Inc.
- Type: iPod device
- Released: July 13, 2006; 20 years ago
- Connectivity: Piezoelectric sensor, receiver
- Website: nike.com/nike-app

The Nike+iPod Sport Kit is an activity tracker device, developed by Nike, Inc., which measures and records the distance and pace of a walk or run. The Nike+iPod consists of a small transmitter device attached to or embedded in a shoe, which communicates with either the Nike+ Sportband, or a receiver plugged into an iPod Nano. It can also work directly with a 2nd Generation iPod Touch (or higher), iPhone 3GS, iPhone 4, iPhone 4S, iPhone 5, The Nike+iPod was announced on May 23, 2006. On September 7, 2010, Nike released the Nike+ Running App (originally called Nike+ GPS) on the App Store, which used a tracking engine powered by MotionX that does not require the separate shoe sensor or pedometer. This application works using the accelerometer and GPS of the iPhone and the accelerometer of the iPod Touch, which does not have a GPS chip. Nike+Running is compatible with the iPhone 6 and iPhone 6 Plus down to iPhone 3GS and iPod touch. On June 21, 2012, Nike released Nike+ Running App for Android. The current app is compatible with all Android phones running Android 10 and up.

== Overview ==
The sensor and iPod kit were revealed on May 20, 2006. The kit stores information such as the elapsed time of the workout, the distance traveled, pace, and calories burned by the individual. Nike+ was a collaboration between Nike and Apple; the platform consisted of an iPod, a wireless chip, Nike shoes that accepted the wireless chip, an iTunes membership, and a Nike+ online community. iPods using Nike iPod require a sensor and remote.

The next upgraded product was the Sportband kit, which was announced in April 2008. The kit allows users to store run information without the iPod Nano. The Sportband consists of two parts: a rubber holding strap which is worn around the wrist, and a receiver which resembles a USB key-disk. The receiver displays information comparable to that of the iPod kit on the built-in display. After a run, the receiver can be plugged straight into a USB port and the software will upload the run information automatically to the Nike+ website.

As of August 2008 "Nike+iPod for the Gym" launched, allowing users to record their cardio workouts directly to their iPods. No Sport kit or shoe sensor is required; all that is needed is a compatible iPod (1st–6th generation iPod Nano or 2nd/3rd gen iPod Touch) and an enabled piece of cardio equipment. As of March 2009, the seven largest commercial equipment providers were shipping enabled equipment (Life Fitness, Technogym, Precor USA, Star Trac, Cybex International, Matrix Fitness and Free Motion). The models of compatible cardio equipment include treadmills, stationary bicycles, stair climbers, ellipticals, and others such as Precor's Adaptive Motion Trainer. Once the user syncs an iPod with iTunes, the cardio workouts are automatically stored at Nikeplus.com, where each workout is visualized and tracked based on the number of calories burned. The calories are converted to "CardioMiles", at a ratio of 100:1, allowing cardio users to take full advantage of all the tools and features of Nikeplus.com, and allow them to engage in challenges with other runners, walkers and cardio users, using a common currency.

With the release of the second-generation iPod Touch in 2008, Apple Inc. included a built-in ability to receive Nike+ signals, which allowed the iPod to connect directly to the wireless sensor thus eliminating the need for an external receiver to be connected. Apple also added this capability to the iPhone 3GS (released 2009), iPhone 4 (2010), and third-generation iPod Touch (2009). Those devices use their Broadcom Bluetooth chipset to receive the signals.

On June 7, 2010, Polar and Nike introduced the Polar WearLink+ that works with Nike+. This new product works with the Nike+ SportBand and the fifth generation iPod nano in conjunction with the Nike+ iPod Sport Kit. Polar WearLink+ that works with Nike+ communicates directly with the fifth generation iPod nano and Nike+ SportBand using a proprietary digital protocol but it is dual-mode so it is also compatible with most Polar training computers (all those using 5 kHz analog transmission technology).

Nike+ had 18 million global users as of April 2013. One year later, Nike updated the number of global users to 28 million.

In iOS 6.1.2 (and possibly higher), a hole in the compatibility for the app has allowed jailbroken iPad users to use the native Nike + iPod iPhone and iPod app by moving the app bundle and setting permissions for the app.

On August 23, 2016, the app was renamed to Nike+ Run club as part of an overhaul. The updates were widely criticised and caused a substantial fall in popularity.

On April 30, 2018, Nike retired services for legacy Nike wearable devices, such as the Nike+ FuelBand and the Nike+ SportWatch GPS, and previous versions of apps, including Nike Run Club and Nike Training Club version 4.X and lower. Likewise, Nike no longer supported the Nike+ Connect software that transferred data to a NikePlus Profile or the Nike+ Fuel/FuelBand and Nike+ Move apps.

== Sports kit equipment ==
The kit consists of two pieces: a piezoelectric sensor with a Nordic Semiconductor nRF2402 transmitter that is mounted under the inner sole of the shoe and a receiver that connects to the iPod. They communicate using a 2.4 GHz wireless radio and use Nordic Semiconductor's "ShockBurst" network protocol. The wireless data is encrypted in transit, but some uniquely identifying data is sent in the plain. The wireless protocol was reverse engineered and documented by Dmitry Grinberg in 2011.

Nike recommends that the shoe be a Nike+ model with a special pocket in which to place the device. Nike has released the sensor for individual sale meaning that consumers no longer have to purchase the whole set (the iPod receiver and sensor). As the sensor battery cannot be replaced, a new one must be purchased every time the battery runs out.

Aftermarket solutions are available to users who do not want to use shoes with built-in or hand-made pockets for the foot sensor, such as shoe pouches and containment devices designed to affix the sensor against the shoe laces. No matter how the sensor is integrated with the user's shoes, care must be taken that it is firmly fixed in place and will not jerk around while in use, which would degrade the accuracy.

== Sports kit usage ==
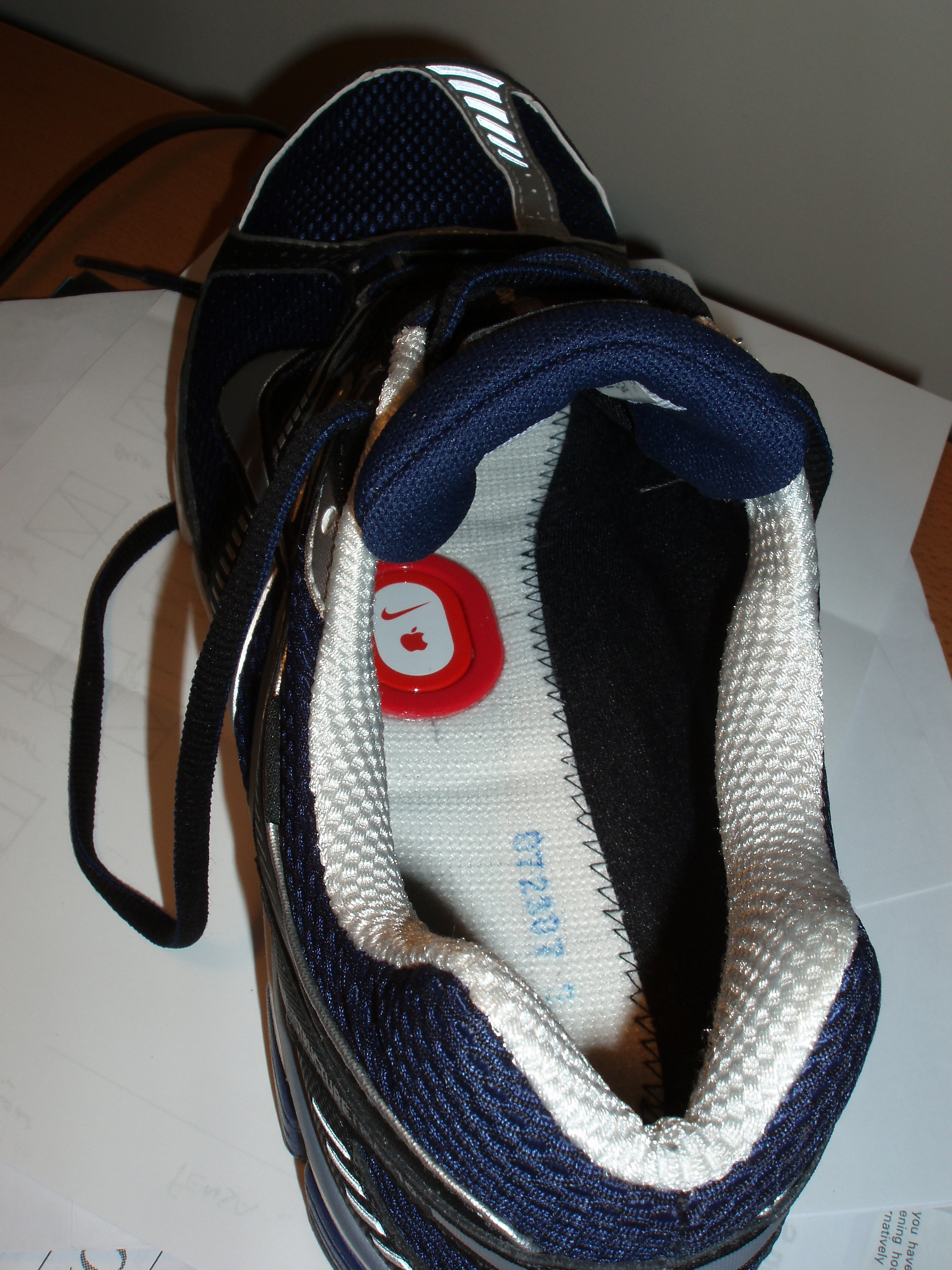
Nike+ iPod transmitter in Nike+ Shoe

The Sports Kit can be used to track running, which it refers to as "workouts". New workouts are started by plugging the receiving unit into the iPod, then navigating through the iPod menu system. The user chooses a goal for the workout, which might be to cover a specific distance, or burn a number of calories, or work out for a specified time. A workout can also be started without a goal, which is called a "Basic Workout". When the workout goal has been set, the receiver seeks the sensor, possibly asking the user to "walk around to activate [the] sensor". The user then must press the center button on the iPod to begin the workout.

Audio feedback is provided in the user's choice of generic male or female voice by the iPod over the course of the workout, depending on the type of workout chosen. For goal-oriented workouts, the feedback will correspond to significant milestones toward the goal. In a distance workout, for example, the audio feedback will inform the user as each mile or kilometer has been completed, as well as the half-way point of the workout, and a countdown of four 100-meter increments at the end of the workout.

The iPod's control wheel functions change slightly during a workout. The Pause button now not only pauses the music but also the workout. Similarly, the Menu button is used to access the controls to end the workout. The Forward and Back buttons are unchanged, performing audio track skip and reverse functions. The Center button has two functions: audio feedback about the current distance, time, and pace are provided when the button is tapped once, while if the button is held down the iPod skips to the "PowerSong" - an audio track chosen by the user, generally intended for motivation.

In addition to the in-workout audio feedback, there are pre-recorded congratulations provided by Lance Armstrong, Tiger Woods, Joan Benoit Samuelson, and Paula Radcliffe whenever a user achieves a personal best (such as fastest mile, fastest 5K, fastest 10K, longest run yet) or reaches certain long-term milestones (such as 250 miles, 500 kilometers). This "celebrity feedback" is heard after the usual end-of-run statistics.

While the Sports Kit can be used immediately after purchase, it will report more accurate results if it is calibrated before the first usage and then regularly afterwards. For calibration, the user finds a fixed known distance of at least 0.25 mile or 400 meters and then sets the Nike+ to calibration mode for the walk or run over that distance. When the walk or run is complete, the device calibrates itself and future workout reporting will reflect statistics closer to that individual user's workout style. Consumer Reports magazine tested the device and found it accurate as long as you keep an even pace. In workouts with varied pace, accuracy was sometimes less than 90%. As walking and running strides can vary significantly, the device should be calibrated for each.

== Hardware ==
Foot sensor:

- Nordic Semiconductor nRF2402 wireless transmitter
- Microchip Technology PIC16F688 microcontroller
- 3V Lithium 2032 battery
- 30mm-diameter piezoelectric sensor

iPod receiver:

- Texas Instruments MSP430-series microcontroller
- Nordic Semiconductor nRF2401 transceiver

== Wireless protocol data and privacy concerns ==
The shoe sensor broadcasts a packet once a second while the user is walking or running, and for ten seconds after the user stops moving. Any other shock also causes the sensor to broadcast data. The protocol is not connection-oriented and can be easily sniffed. While most of the data is encrypted, a piece of the device's serial number is sent without encryption. This unique 32-bit number has been successfully used to identify specific Nike+ foot sensors. Uses of this technique include remote-operating a car lock, customer tracking, and stalking.

The data sent by the device every second is cumulative, since the device was first used, and thus can be very revealing of a user's exercise habits and life in general. The data is: number of steps run, number of steps walked, distance run, distance walked, and number of hours device has been on.

== Online integration ==
In addition to tracking personal workout statistics, the Nike+ integrates directly with the Nike website. Workout data can be automatically uploaded to the website during an iPod sync with iTunes or through another program via the website's public API. The uploaded information is mostly not personally-identifying, but does also contain some personal statistics such as weight (if configured). Workout data is stored in XML files on the iPod, which has led some web and applications programmers to offer alternatives to the official Nike reports.

On October 19, 2006, new features were added to the Nike+ website, including the ability to name runs. Forums were also added (which they refer to as "talk some trash"), allowing users to meet and challenge other runners, ask questions, and give feedback. Recently, there have been several more additions to the Nike+ website including but not limited to: a challenge gallery where all user created challenges are viewable, the ability to name the route taken when running or walking, compatibility with the new iPod Nano (fifth generation), a distance club to view everyone's total distance traveled, fastest 5K et cetera.

== Recent findings & technical details ==
=== Fully decoded packet protocol & hardware details ===
A hacker/researcher named “Dmitry.GR” has published a breakdown of how the Nike + iPod sensor’s wireless protocol works — down to modulation, packet layout, CRC, etc.

Key takeaways:

- The sensor uses an nRF24 series radio (nRF2402) operating at 2.4 GHz with GFSK (Gaussian Frequency Shift Keying) modulation.
- Settings inferred: 250 kbps data rate, 16-bit CRC, maximum transmit power (≈1 mW) on channel number 25.
- Packet length is 28 bytes (plus address / overhead to 32 bytes), and each message begins with a fixed “0x0D” byte as part of the TO (address) field.
- The “unique 4 bytes” that many enthusiasts believed to be a full serial identifier of the tag are not entirely unique. You can only reconstruct part of the actual serial from them.
- The sensor itself does some internal classification: e.g. distinguishing walking vs running internally, storing some “lifetime” counters, etc.
- Interestingly, the system has a built-in guard: if a sensor reports “on time” >1000 hours (cumulative), Apple’s higher-level code treats the battery as “dead,” even if it physically isn’t.

== See also ==
- NikeFuel
- Nike+ FuelBand
- RS-Computer, 1986 shoe
- Fitbit
- Apple Watch
- Activity tracker
- GPS watch
- Smartwatch
