= Nike+ Kinect Training =

2012 video game

- Developer: Sumo Digital
- Publisher: Microsoft Studios
- Platform: Xbox 360
- Release: NA: 30 October 2012; EU: 2 November 2012; JP: 15 November 2012
- Genres: Exergame, Fitness
- Mode: Single-player

Nike+ Kinect Training is a fitness video game for the Xbox 360. It is developed in cooperation with athletics company Nike and requires the Kinect sensor. The game allows the user to earn and compete with others with NikeFuel points, a unit of measuring athletic performance.

== Reception ==
Reception

Aggregate score
Aggregator	Score
Metacritic	71/100

Review scores
Publication	Score
Hardcore Gamer	3.5/5
Jeuxvideo.com	14/20
Official Xbox Magazine (UK)	7/10
Official Xbox Magazine (US)	7.5/10
The Digital Fix	7/10
Digital Spy	3/5

The game received "mixed or average reviews" according to the review aggregation website Metacritic.

In February 2013, Nike+ Kinect Training's development team was nominated for a BAFTA Games award in the Sports/Fitness category. However, it lost to New Star Soccer at the 9th British Academy Games Awards. During the 16th Annual D.I.C.E. Awards, the Academy of Interactive Arts & Sciences nominated Nike+ Kinect Training for "Outstanding Achievement in Connectivity", ultimately losing the award to Halo 4.
