= GPS watch =

Watch with integrated GPS receiver

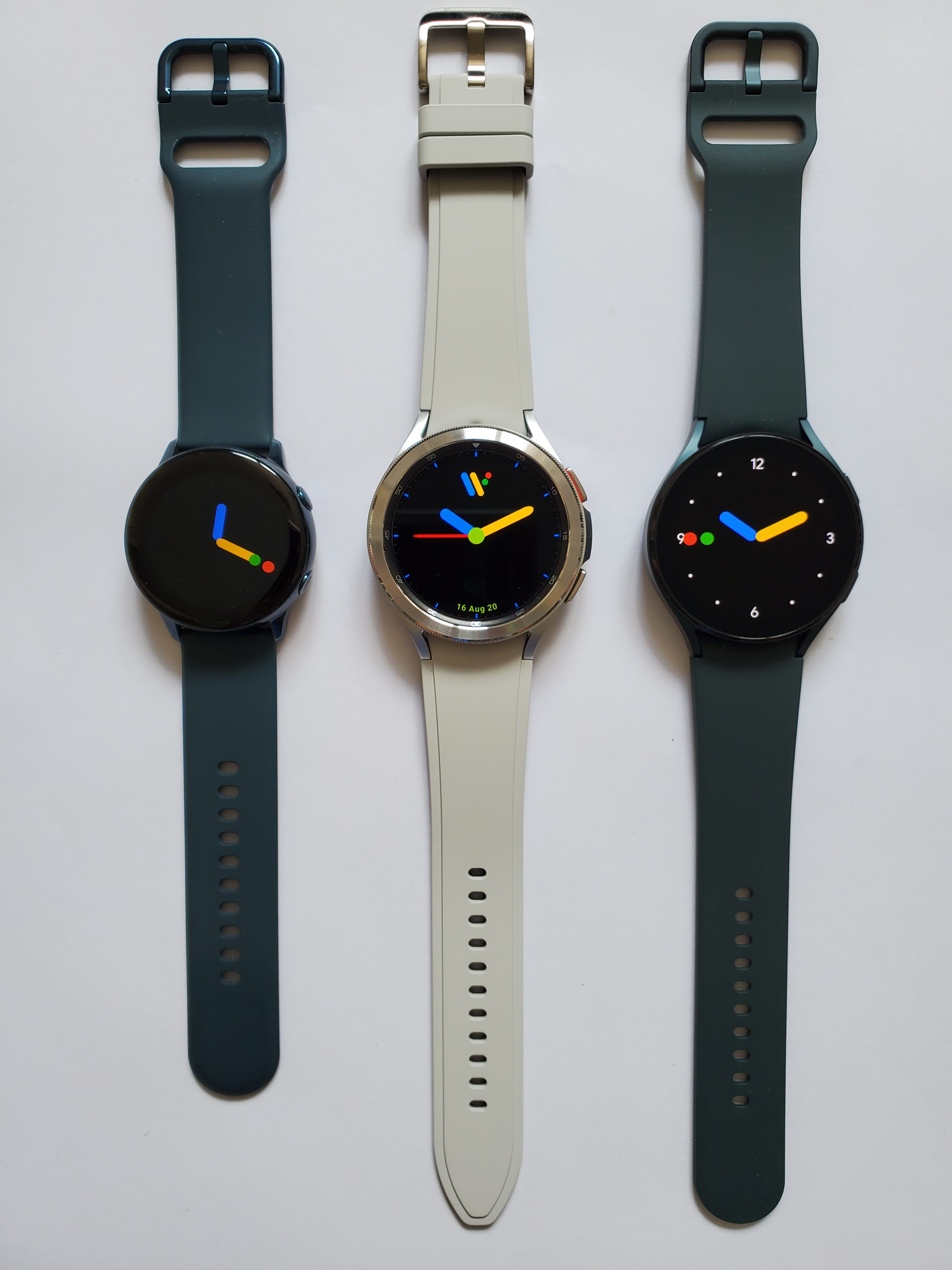
Example of a smartwatch – Samsung Galaxy Watch series

A GPS watch is a device with an integrated GPS receiver that is worn as a single unit strapped onto a wrist, in the manner of a bracelet. The watch can have other features and capabilities depending on its intended purpose and be a smartwatch. GPS watches are most often used for sports and fitness purposes. Many can connect to external sensors by the wireless ANT+ protocol and/or to a computer by USB to transfer data and configuration. Common sensors used are heart rate monitors and footpods (running cadence and speed sensor). A footpod can be used to supplement or replace GPS data, such as providing treadmill speed and distance for the watch to log and share. Recharging by USB is commonplace.

== Purpose ==
A GPS watch is commonly a sports watch (a device used for sports and exercise in general rather than just GPS functionality). It may be designed for one particular sport or other purpose or provide modes and features to suit several.

Examples of common purposes:

- Data logging
- Navigation
- Fitness training (Many watches can be used for many sports, such as running, walking, hiking, cycling, or swimming.)
- Specific sport assistance (such as golf)
- Locating children and adults with intellectual disabilities that are at risk of wandering or elopement. This function makes it a personal tracking system or asset tracking.

Wirecutter describes GPS watches as a more advanced form of fitness trackers.

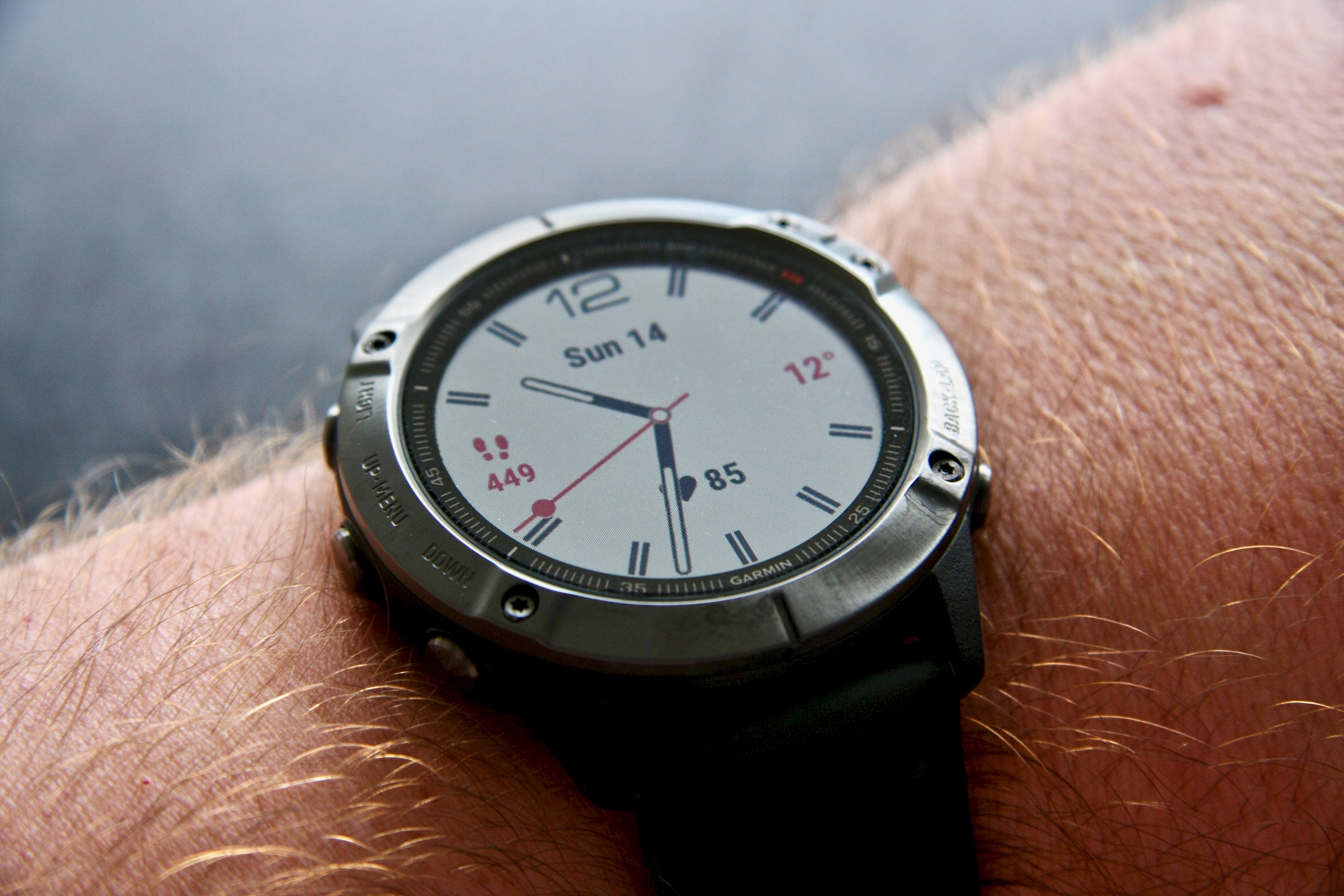
A Garmin fēnix 6X Sapphire smartwatch with a built-in GPS/Glonass/Galileo receiver

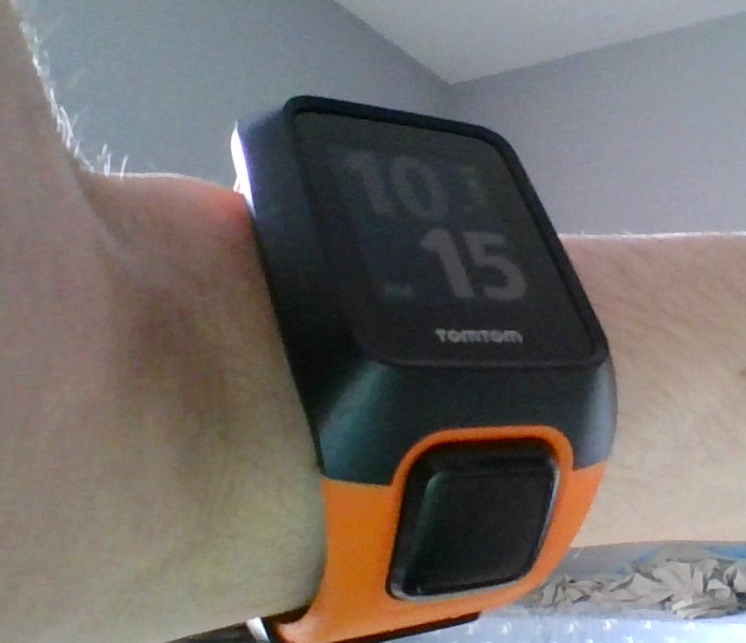
TomTom Runner 2 with orange wristband

== See also ==
- Activity tracker
- Bluetooth
- GPS navigation device
- GPS tracking unit
- Heart rate monitor
- Inertial footpod
- Nike+ FuelBand
- Pedometer
- Quantified Self
- Smart band
- Smartwatch
