= Claudia Linnhoff-Popien =

German computer scientist

- Born: Claudia Popien; 1966 (age 59–60); Magdeburg, Germany
- Education: Leipzig University; Aachen University
- Known for: Mobile and distributed computing
- Scientific career
- Fields: Computer Science
- Workplaces: Aachen University; Washington University in St. Louis; LMU Munich
- Thesis: Dienstvermittlung in Verteilten Systemen (1994)
- Doctoral advisor: Otto Spaniol
- Website: http://www.mobile.ifi.lmu.de

Claudia Linnhoff-Popien is a German computer scientist.

== Professional career ==
Linnhoff-Popien finished her graduate studies in mathematics with focus informatics 1989 at Leipzig University. That followed a teaching and research work at Technical University, Magdeburg. Beginning in 1991 she worked as a research assistant at Aachen University of Technology, where she earned her Ph.D. in 1994. From 1995 to 1997 she did different lectureships at University of Essen. 1997 she worked as a research visitor at the Applied Research Institute of Washington University in St. Louis. In 1998, she finished her habilitation at Aachen University of Technology and joined the faculty of LMU Munich as an associate professor. Since 2003 she is full professor there for mobile and distributed computing.

Linnhoff-Popien is member of more than 50 programme committees of international conferences organized by IFIP, ACM, IEEE, Gesellschaft für Informatik, VDE and further organizations. She is expert witness for Deutsche Forschungsgemeinschaft, Federal Ministry of Education and Research (Germany) and German Academic Exchange Service. She works on several research projects supported by industry and government including distributed computing and ubiquitous computing as well as service discovery and context awareness.

== Publications (extract) ==
- with Ralf Schneider, Michael Zaddach: Digital Marketplaces Unleashed. Springer 2017 ISBN 9783662492758
- with Thomas Strang: Location- and Context-Awareness. Springer 2005 ISBN 9783540320425
- with Heinz-Gerd Hegering: Trends in Distributed Systems: Towards a Universal Service Market. Springer 2000 ISBN 9783540410249
- with Otto Spaniol: Trends in Distributed Systems: CORBA and Beyond. Springer 1996 ISBN 9783540618423
- with Alexander Schill, Christian Mittasch, Otto Spaniol: "Distributed Platforms", Proceedings of the IFIP/IEEE International Conference on Distributed Platforms: Client Server and Beyond. Springer 1996, ISBN 9781475750102
