= Inertial footpod =

Device for tracking running measurements

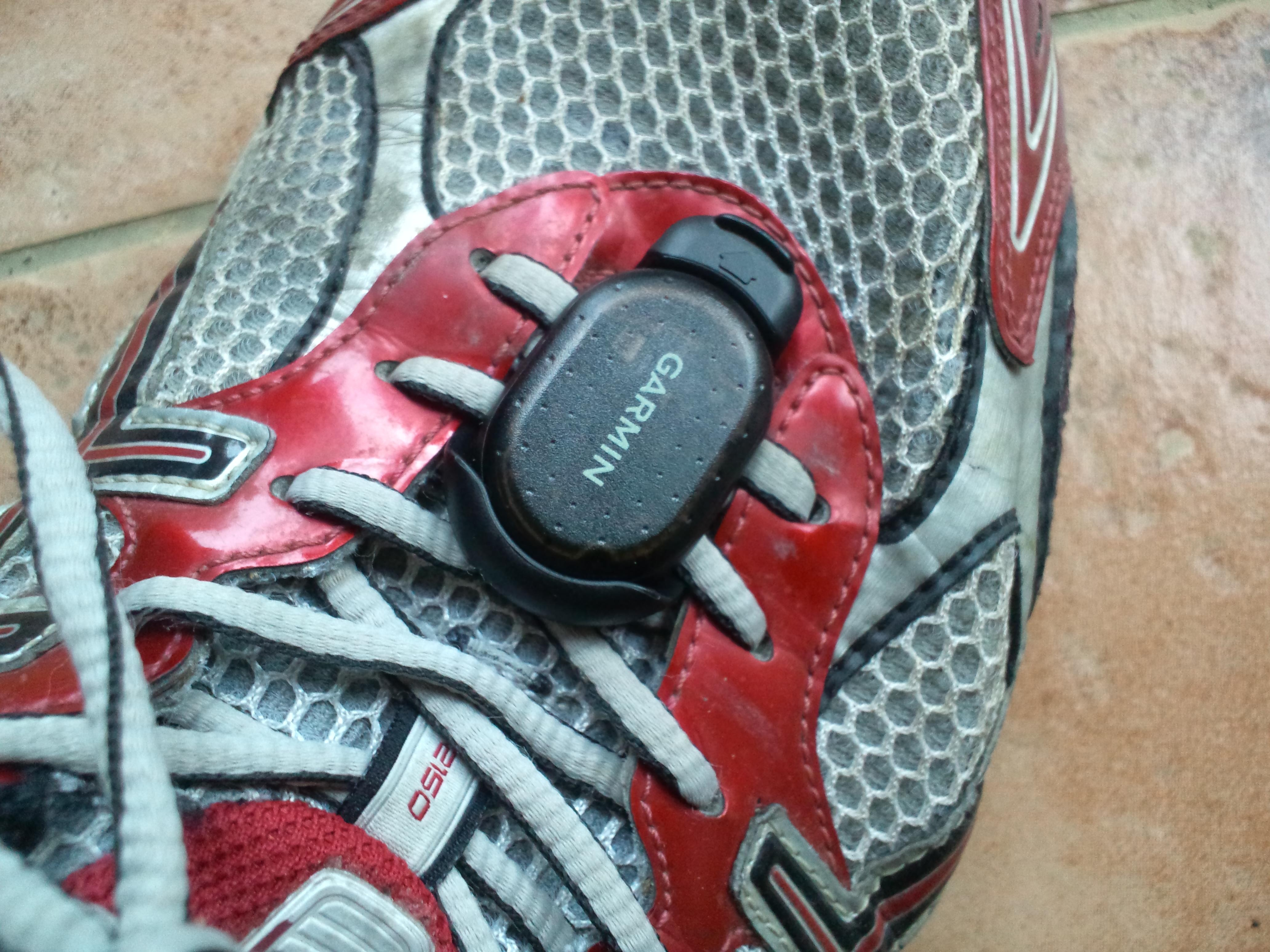
Foot pod attached to a running shoe.

An inertial footpod is a device used to track running measurements such as speed, distance travelled, pace, etc., which would generally only be available on treadmills or with a GPS unit.

This device is usually small and attaches to a runner's foot. It uses one or more accelerometers and processes several times a second to compute speed.

One example is the foot pod employed by the Polar S625x running computer.

== See also ==
- Musgrave Footprint
- Pedometer
