= Nike+ FuelBand =

Activity tracker

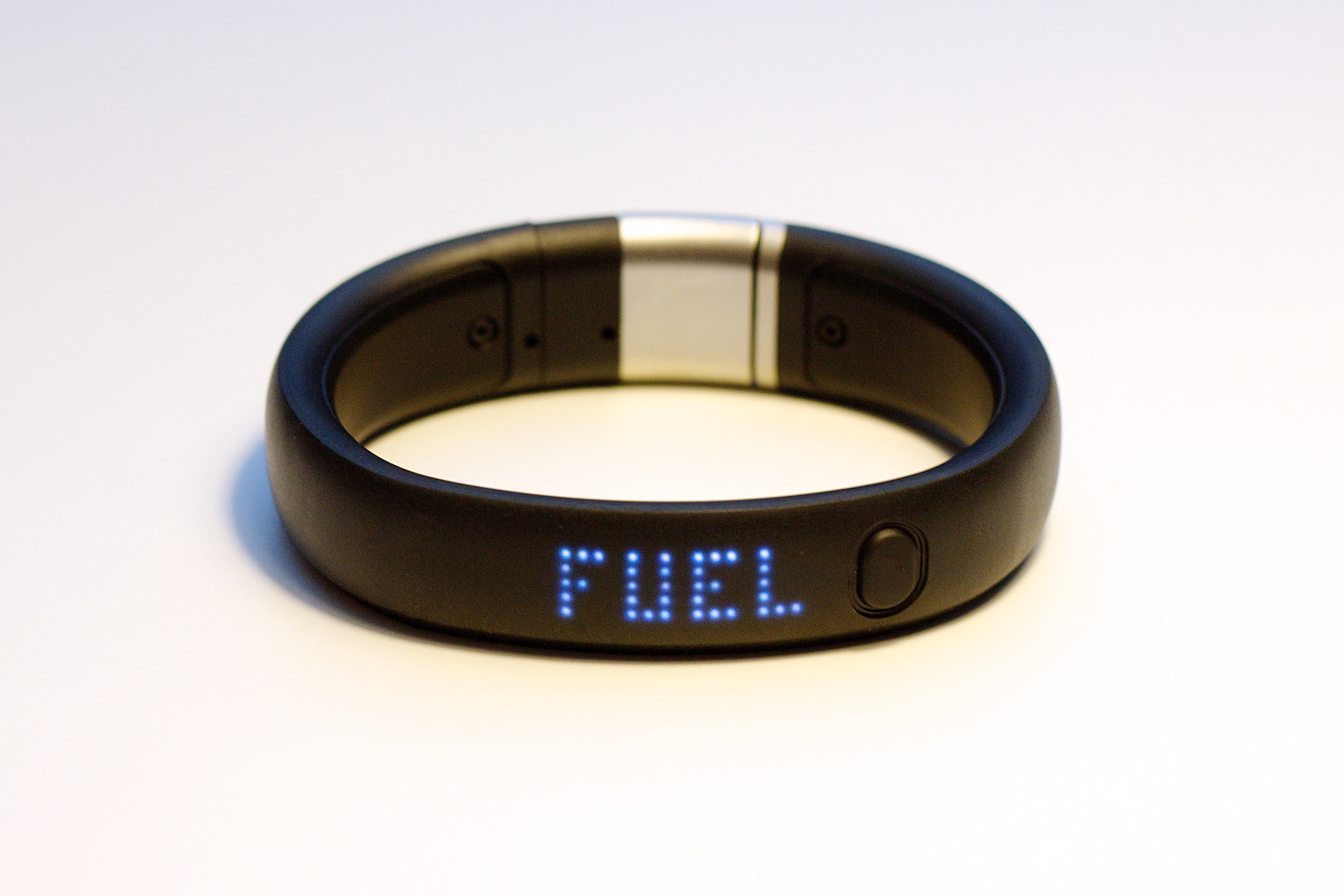
- Nike FuelBand
- Manufacturer: Nike, Inc.
- Released: 2012; 14 years ago

The Nike+ FuelBand was an activity tracker worn on the wrist and compatible with iPhone, iPad, or Android devices.

As part of the Quantified Self movement, the FuelBand allows its wearers to track their physical activity, steps taken daily, and amount of energy burned. The information from the wristband is integrated into the Nike+ online community and phone application, allowing wearers to set their own fitness goals, monitor their progression, and compare themselves to others part of the community. Nike+ relies on the gamification of fitness activities turning all tracked movement into NikeFuel points, which can unlock achievements, can be shared with friends, or can be used to engage others in competition.

As of April 30, 2018, Nike unilaterally stopped providing the previously promised services for legacy Nike wearable devices, such as the Nike+ FuelBand and the Nike+ SportWatch GPS, and previous versions of apps, including Nike Run Club and Nike Training Club version 4.X and lower. Likewise, Nike no longer supported the Nike+ Connect software that transfers data to a user's NikePlus Profile or the Nike+ Fuel/FuelBand and Nike+ Move apps. Despite Nike claiming explicitly in 2015 that it would continue to support FuelBands with the app after discontinuing their production, Nike gave its customers only two weeks' notice in 2018 before effectively making their FuelBands permanently inoperable (due to inability to clear their memory).

== Nike+ FuelBand SE ==
The SE has Bluetooth 4.0, automatically synchronizing with the Nike Activity tracker mobile app. Like the Jawbone UP24 and FitBit Force, The Nike+ Fuelband SE can now track your sleep schedule. Introduced the new feature "sessions". Released November 5, 2013 for $149.99. Originally available for iOS 7 devices (November 28, 2013) and currently available to Android devices as well. Battery Life: 8 days

== Launch ==
The FuelBand became available for pre-order for U.S. customers online at NikeStore.com on January 19, 2012, and was officially released in the U.S. at select Nike stores on February 22, 2012. Initially the FuelBand was available in only one colour, "Black Steel", but a limited edition "Ice" colour was released on July 27, 2012, and following that, on October 31, 2012, "White Ice" and "Black Ice" began retail in both Nike and Apple stores. October 31 also marked the launch of Nike+ FuelBand in Canada, while earlier in the year on May 1, 2012, the FuelBand was released in the United Kingdom for £139.

== Sales ==
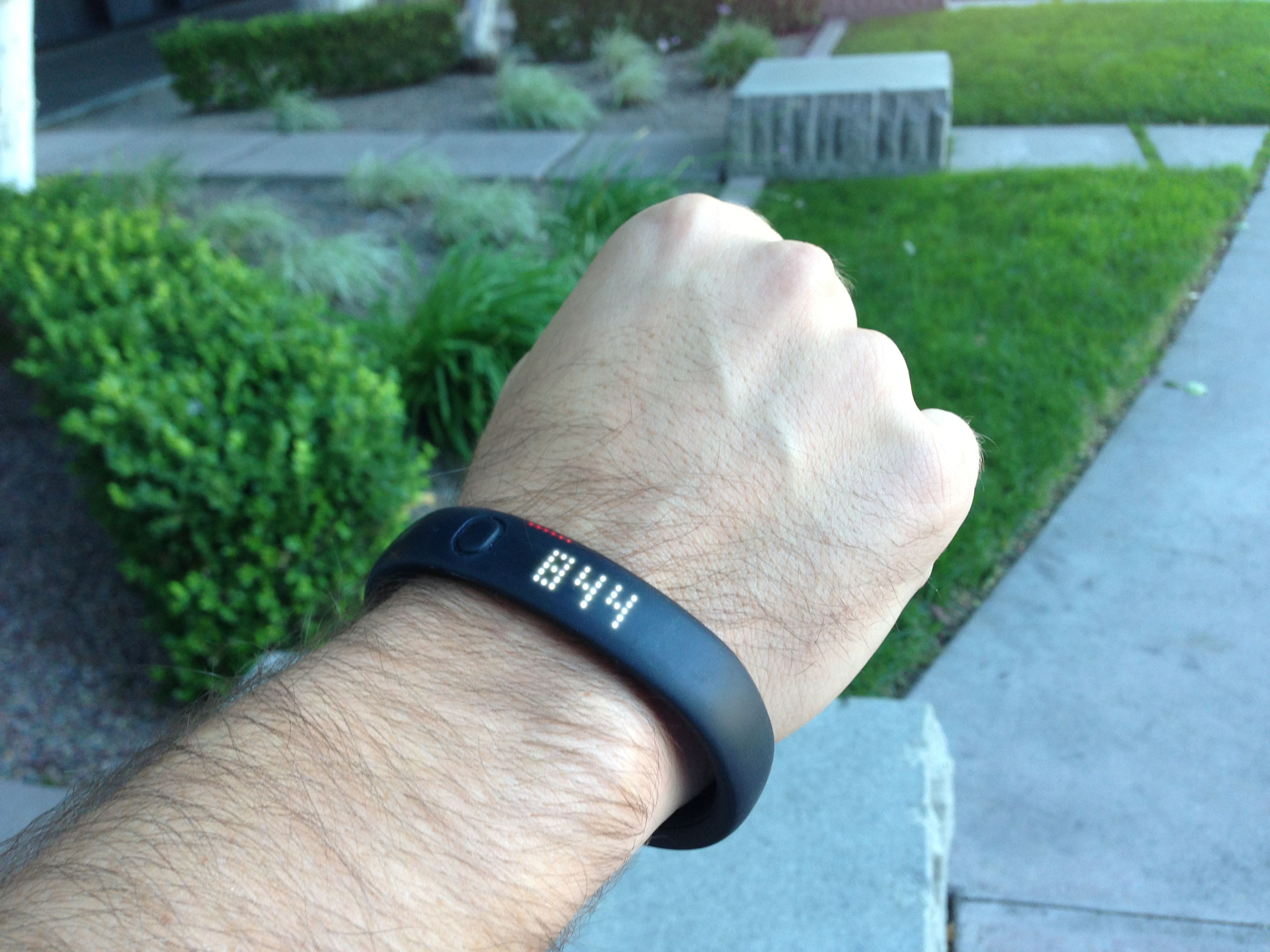
Nike FuelBand used as a counter

Nike Inc.'s Equipment division saw an 18% rise in profits for the 2012 fiscal year after introduction of the Nike+ FuelBand, in comparison to the -1% loss during the 2011 fiscal year. Before the FuelBand's official American release, it was open for pre-order online, and was sold out both times within the same day. A consumer on Twitter timed one of the pre-order periods to be exactly 4 minutes before all FuelBands were sold out and Nikestore.com was overloaded due to customer traffic. Nike+ FuelBands were being sold on eBay during the first couple of months after pre-order for approximately double the retail price.

== Discontinuation ==
In April 2014, there was a report that Nike has discontinued the Fuelband and focus on software applications.

== Web community ==
The FuelBand comes with access to the Nike+ web community that is set up via the Nike+ Connect Software. The software is a necessary component of the activity tracking, as the customization of personal statistics through the software is what enables the FuelBand to calculate the amount of energy burned, as well as the number of NikeFuel points gained. The Nike+ web community allows product owners to create an online profile where they can showcase their personal statistics, such as how many goals have been met, how many steps have been taken, and how many NikeFuel points have been amassed. The profile also displays the trophies and achievements an individual has unlocked, and can be integrated with Facebook and Twitter in order to connect with friends. Upon logging into the Nike+ site, users are given a graphical display of their daily activity, proximity to hitting their goal, positive feedback, and recommendations for more activities. The website also has an activity section that gives a graphical breakdown of a user's total activity by year, month, and day.

== Mobile application ==
The FuelBand launched with a mobile phone application that was compatible with only iOS 7.1+. The Nike+ FuelBand application was an on-the-go addition to the web community; it synced information from the wristband to the iPhone (or iPad) via Bluetooth, and subsequently uploaded the information to the Nike+ site. The Nike+ FuelBand application was 70 MB, was free to download, and had a 4+ rating on the iTunes Store before it was removed.

== Specifications ==
- Sizes (circumference): small (5.97 in), medium (6.77 in), large (7.76 in)

Can be customized to fit using 0.32in or 0.63in inserts.

- Width: 0.63in at LED, 0.75in at latch
- Thickness: 0.27in at LED, 0.32in at latch
- Weight: 27 g - 35 g (higher end includes insert)
- Battery type: 2 Lithium Polymer Batteries (3.7 V)
- Battery life: up to 7 days
- Display type: 20 color red/green LED, 100 white LED
- Display Modes:

1. Time
2. Energy burned (measured in Calories)
3. Steps taken
4. NikeFuel earned

- Materials: Thermoplastic elastomers (TPE) 43%, Polypropylene (PP) 34%, Magnesium 14%, Stainless Steel 9%
- Warranty: 1 year out of box
- Water Resistant: Yes
- Waterproof: No
- Ambidextrous: Yes

== Nike+ API ==
On December 3, 2012, Hacknikefuelband.com received a cease and desist notice from Nike Inc. A month later Nike Inc. announces its Nike+ API, allowing developers "to explore the Nike+ API using the developer’s own profile and activity data, including NikeFuel, running pace and distance, running routes, records, streaks and more."

== Reception ==
As a device that sits on the wrist, the FuelBand has difficulty time-tracking activities that rely solely upon lower body movement (such as a spin class) and it does not fare well for resistance based activities including weight lifting and yoga workouts. The FuelBand is water-resistant, but not waterproof, thus it cannot be used for any in-water activities (e.g., swimming, wakeboarding, or surfing). FuelBand wearers have found that bumpy car rides can increase NikeFuel points and that vigorous arm shaking also amounts to a significant point increase.

Michael Kim, who specializes in designing software to influence behaviours, critiques the FuelBand as not being sustainable in the long haul, saying, "Points and badges do not lead to behavior change." On the other hand, a nutritionist professor at Ryerson University (now Toronto Metropolitan University) is quoted as saying, "Anything that motivates exercise is a good thing, it could be really useful for people that need the support", and despite finding the FuelBand a useful tool for maintaining a healthy and active lifestyle, she also points out the FuelBand neglects to take into account food energy intake.

Because the Nike+ web community profile can be linked to both Facebook and Twitter, users can now share their results and accomplishments with their friends. This has the ability to lead to a greater chance for positive results because interaction and motivation from friends has proven to benefit workout habits. "A 2011 Pew Internet study found that 80% of Internet users look for health information online, 27% of U.S. Internet users had tracked health data online, and 18% had sought to locate others with similar health concerns via the Internet". These statistics suggest that self-empowerment and action taking, in regard to health, is becoming a much more accepted behavior norm, instead of a small online community, like it has been in the past. When sharing workout results with friends on social media, one is much more aware of their personal well-being. Knowing your physical fitness and activity levels are very important for living a healthy life, which leads to the conclusion why many say that technologies like the FuelBand are necessary for being physically responsible for oneself. The FuelBand makes it much more simple to live a healthy and informed life and this can be related to maintaining personal health records. Personal health records are types of medical records that are edited, administrated, and owned by the patient, instead of the doctor or health care administrator. Personal health records are usually stored on online databases, and they have proven to be "a key step in empowering health self-management as we can have a more active role in understanding, accessing, maintaining, and sharing our personal health information, and in coordinating and participating in our own health care". Studies have shown that PHR users are over 65% more likely to follow up on recommended care or to act on the change that they desire, which indicates the potentially beneficial influences in behaviors of PHRs. The FuelBand has the potential to help its users get in great physical shape and to be well informed of their health records and statistics. Because of this and the ability to be connected to an online community through social media, the FuelBand can be seen as an innovative technology that is representing the way that the health field is going in the future. Health practices are becoming more personalized and more power is being given to the individual and the FuelBand is an exact example of this new field of technology that is growing in size.

== Competition ==
The Nike+ FuelBand is in direct competition with Jawbone UP, Basis Watch, and Fitbit Flex. The FuelBand is also being compared to other fitness trackers that are not wrist-based, including the rest of the Fitbit Tracker family. While the Jawbone comes in more colors, has a longer battery life of up to 10 days, tracks sleep, and has a vibrational feedback for inactivity, the Fuelband has an LED screen, Bluetooth connectivity, and improved web content including the proprietary NikeFuel. The Basis watch comes at a higher price than the FuelBand. The Fitbit trackers in a similar price range also offered many more features: such as flights of stairs climbed, sleep tracking, and silent alarms utilizing a built in motor.

== See also ==
- Pebble (watch)
- Jawbone (company)
- Garmin
- Fitbit
- Apple Watch
