= Endomondo =

Fitness tracking mobile application

- Developers: Endomondo.com; Enfinify Holding LLC (owner)
- Release: 2007, relaunched 2024
- Operating system: iOS, Android
- Available in: 1 languages
- List of languages English
- Type: Fitness
- License: Freemium
- Website: www.endomondo.com

Endomondo is a health and wellness website. It allows users to track their health statistics and provides insights on fitness trends. Originally launched in 2007, Endomondo was acquired by Under Armour in 2015. Under Armour shut down Endomondo in 2020, but, by 2024, Endomondo re-launched as its own entity.

== History ==
Endomondo started in Denmark in 2007 by Mette Lykke, Christian Birk and Jakob Nordenhof Jønck. In 2011, the company opened an office in Silicon Valley, USA, but kept its research and development department in Denmark. In 2013, Endomondo LLC was listed in Red Herring as a European finalists for promising start-ups. The same year, Christian Birk and Jakob Nordenhof Jønck left the daily operation of the company, but kept co-ownership.

In February 2015, Endomondo LLC was acquired by athletic apparel maker Under Armour for $85 million. Endomondo, at that time, had over 20 million users.

In October 2020, Under Armour announced that Endomondo would be shutting down and selling off MyFitnessPal to the private equity firm Francisco Partners for $345 million. Service stopped on 31 December 2020, giving customers until 15 February 2021 to download an archive of their historic data.

In 2024, Endomondo.com was brought back online as a professional fitness guidance website.

== Features ==
Endomondo provides numerous workouts, guidance on exercises, performance-enhancing nutrition, and tips. Previously, Endomondo was able to track numerous fitness attributes such as running routes, distance, duration, and calories. The software helped analyze performance and recommend improvements.

There was a free and a paid version available of Endomondo. The free version had advertisements. The paid Premium version was free of advertisements and included additional features such as the possibility to create one's own training plan. The offering of additional features was different between the Android, IOS and Windows platforms, and had significantly better features for tracking performance over time than UnderArmours suggested replacement.

Endomondo offered challenges of various types to the user and allowed users to create their own challenges.
